= Androgeos =

Androgeos or Androgeus (Ancient Greek: Ἀνδρόγεως, Latin: Androgeum or Androgeōs derived from andros "of a man" and geos, genitive gē "earth, land") was the name of two individuals in Classical mythology.

- Androgeus, son of Minos and Pasiphaë.
- Androgeus, a Greek soldier during the sack of Troy.
