= Crete (mythology) =

Several figures in Greek mythology

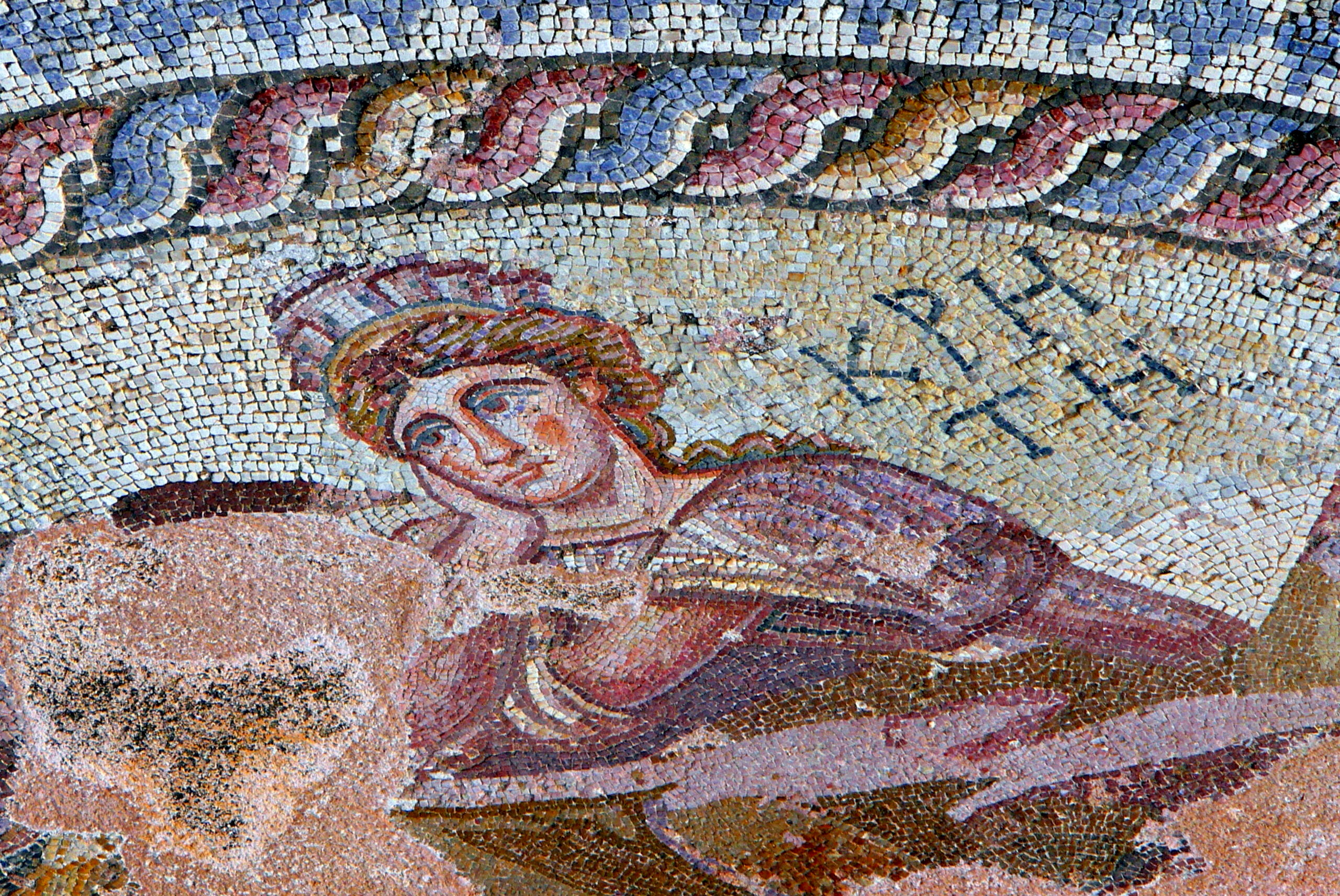
Crete personified on a 4th-century Roman mosaic from the Paphos Archaeological Park in Cyprus.

In Greek mythology, the name Crete (Ancient Greek: Κρήτη) may refer to several figures, all of whom are associated with the homonymous island of Crete, and may have been considered its eponyms:

- Crete, daughter of Hesperus and one of the Hesperides and another possible eponym of Crete.
- Crete, daughter of one of the Cretan Curetes, who married Ammon. She was actually said to have given her name to the island Crete, which was believed to have previously been called Idaea.
- Crete, possible mother of Pasiphaë by Helios.
- Crete, daughter of Asterius, who married Minos, in one version. In this regard, she was considered the mother of Acacallis, Ariadne, Androgeus, Deucalion, Phaedra, Glaucus, Catreus and Xenodice.
- Crete, daughter of Deucalion (son of Minos), sister of Idomeneus and half-sister of Molus.
- Crete, the mother of Car, the eponym of the Carians, by Zeus.

== See also ==
- Cres (mythology)
