= Acacallis (mythology) =

In Greek mythology, a princess of Crete

Acacallis (Ancient Greek: Ἀκακαλλίς) in Greek mythology, was princess of Crete. The Bibliotheca calls her Acalle (Ἀκάλλη).

== Family ==
Acacallis was the daughter of Minos, king of Crete, and Pasiphae the daughter of Helios, or Crete the daughter of Asterion. She was the sister of Ariadne, Androgeus, Deucalion, Phaedra, Glaucus, Catreus and Xenodice.

According to a Cretan mythological tradition, she had a son with Hermes, Cydon, the founder of Cydonia. Other traditions give Cydon as the offspring of Acacallis and Apollo, and thus, brother to Oaxes. Yet others wrote that Acacallis mothered Cydon with Hermes, and Naxos (eponym of the island Naxos) with Apollo.

Another tradition relates that Acacallis and Apollo had a son named Miletus. Still other traditions relate that another son was born of her and Apollo, named Amphithemis or Garamas (in some stories, the first mortal born). Lastly by Apollo, she was also said to be the mother of Phylacides and Phylander.

Comparative table of Acacallis's family
Relation	Names	Sources								
Relation	Names	Apollonius			Apollodorus	Pausanias		Antoninus	Servius	Stephanus
Relation	Names	Arg.	Sch.		Apollodorus	Pausanias		Antoninus	Eclog.	Stephanus
Parents	Minos and Pasiphae				✓					
Parents	Minos and Crete				✓					
Parents	Minos	✓				✓		✓		
Consort	Hermes		✓			✓				
Consort	Apollo	✓		✓			✓	✓	✓	✓
Children	Amphithemis	✓								
Children	Cydon		✓			✓				✓
Children	Naxos			✓						
Children	Phylacides						✓			
Children	Phylander						✓			
Children	Miletus							✓		
Children	Oaxes								✓	✓

== Mythology ==
Fearing her father's wrath, she exposed her son Miletus, but Apollo commanded she-wolves to nurse him until he could be taken in and raised by shepherds. He grew up strong and handsome, and Minos was seized with desire for the boy. Miletus fled Crete to avoid being becoming the eromenos of the king, and went on to found the eponymous city, Miletus.

Pausanias relates that when Apollo came to Carmanor to be cleansed for the murder of Python, he mated with Acacallis (said to be a nymph in this particular version), and that from their union were born Phylacides and Phylander. People of the Cretan city Elyrus sent to Delphi a bronze statue of a goat suckling these two children, which suggests that they must have been abandoned by their mother.

Acacallis was in Crete a common name for a narcissus.
