= Catreus =

King in Greek mythology

- King of Crete
- Member of the Cretan Royal Family
- Predecessor: Deucalion
- Successor: Idomeneus
- Abode: Crete

Genealogy
- Parents: Minos and Pasiphae or Crete
- Siblings: Acacallis, Ariadne, Androgeus, Xenodice, Phaedra, Glaucus and Deucalion
- Offspring: Althaemenes, Apemosyne, Aerope and Clymene

In Greek mythology, Catreus, also spelled Katreus (Ancient Greek: Κατρεύς; pronounced /ˈkeɪtri.əs/, KAY-tree-uhs or /ˈkeɪtruːs/, KAY-trooss), was the eldest son of Minos and Pasiphaë, and Minos's successor as king of Crete. Catreus had one son, Althaemenes, and three daughters, Apemosyne, Aerope and Clymene. Catreus was mistakenly killed by his son Althaemenes thereby fulfilling an oracle's prophecy.

== Mythology ==
According to Apollodorus's account, an oracle told Catreus that one of his children would kill him. Although Catreus kept the prophecy secret, his son Althaemenes found out, and fearing that he would be the one to kill his father, took his sister Apemosyne and left Crete for Rhodes. Catreus gave his other daughters to Nauplius to be sold off in foreign lands, and Aerope married Pleisthenes (or Atreus), but Nauplius kept Clymene for himself as wife. Years later, as an old man Catreus sailed the seas searching for his son, so that he could pass on his kingship to him. His ship stopped at Rhodes and was mistaken by some cowherds for a pirate ship. Catreus tried to explain who he was, but could not be heard above the barking of the cowherds' dogs. Althaemenes arrived and killed his father with his javelin, thus fulfilling the prophecy. When Althaemenes realized what he had done, Althaemenes prayed and was swallowed up by a chasm in the ground.

Diodorus Siculus, gives a slightly different version of the story, saying that an oracle had been given to Althaemenes which said that he was destined to kill his father. Another tradition involving Catreus's daughter Aerope, followed by Euripides in his lost play Kressai, and possibly by Sophocles in his play Ajax, was that Catreus found Aerope in bed with a slave and sent her to Nauplius to be drowned.

Catreus, an ancient Cretan city mentioned by the second-century Greek geographer Pausanias, was apparently supposed by the Cretans to have been founded by Catreus. According to Apollodorus, Catreus's grandson Menelaus (Aerope's son) was away in Crete, presiding at Catreus's funeral, when Paris took Helen to Troy.

== Parallel story ==
The story of Catreus shares similarities with stories told about Aleus, king of Tegea. In these stories, Aleus received an oracle that his grandson would kill Aleus's sons, so Aleus took measures to keep his daughter Auge a virgin, nevertheless Auge became pregnant (by Heracles) and Aleus (as did Catreus) gives his daughter to Nauplius, to be drowned but instead Nauplius sold her to the Mysian king Tethras, who adopts her son Telephus, as his heir. As an adult Telephus returns to Tegea and unknowingly kills his uncles.
