= Xenodice (mythology) =

Various characters in Greek mythology

In Greek mythology, Xenodice or Xenodike (Ancient Greek: Ξενοδίκη) may refer to the following characters:

- Xenodice, a Cretan princess as the daughter of King Minos either by Pasiphae or Crete. She was the sister of Acacallis, Ariadne, Androgeus, Deucalion, Phaedra, Glaucus and Catreus.
- Xenodice, a Trojan captive. (see List of children of Priam)
- Xenodice, daughter of Syleus, killed by Heracles along with her father.
