= Damasen =

Giant in the Dionysiaca

In Nonnus's epic poem the Dionysiaca, Damasen (Ancient Greek: Δαμασήν, romanized: Damasên, derived from damazô or damasô "to subdue") is a Lydian giant. He is the son of Gaia (the Earth), and was nursed by Eris, the goddess of discord. The story of Damasen is only recounted by the late antiquity epic poet Nonnus in his poem, and he does not appear in any other text of the ancient Greek and Roman corpus.

== Dionysiaca ==
At birth, Damasen was born with a spear and had a thick hairy beard that covered his chin. Due to his large stature, he was described as "warlike". In his childhood, he wielded lances and spears. The Greek goddess of childbirth, Eileithyia, bestowed him with a shield.

When the hero Tylon or Tylus ('knot' or 'phallus') was fatally bitten by a poisonous serpent, his sister Moria appealed to Damasen to avenge her brother. Damasen agreed to avenge Tylus and pulled a tree out of the ground to fight the serpent. The serpent fought back by wrapping itself around Damasen and spitting poison into his face. Despite the attack, the giant threw the serpent off of him and brought down the tree he was holding. The tree collided with the serpent's head before it sunk its roots into the ground, taking the serpent into the ground with it.

Another serpent, a female one, then fetched 'the flower of Zeus' from the woods, which was a painkilling herb. She laid it on the lips of the dead serpent, bringing it to life. Moria saw this and also got the flower of Zeus to bring to her dead brother, Tylus. The flower brought him back to life as he stood up again on both his feet.

== See also ==
- Glaucus
- Porphyrion
- Picolous
- Orion
