= Deucalion (son of Minos) =

King of Crete and son of Minos in Greek mythology

In Greek mythology, Deucalion or Deukalion (/dju:keɪli:ən/; Ancient Greek: Δευκαλίων τῆς Κρήτης), was a king of Crete. He was counted among the Argonauts and the Calydonian Hunters.

== Family ==
Deucalion was the second eldest son of Minos either by Pasiphae or Crete and thus grandson of Zeus. He was the brother of Acacallis, Ariadne, Androgeus, Xenodice, Phaedra, Glaucus and Catreus. By Cleopatra, Deucalion fathered Idomeneus who succeeded him and led the kingdom into the Trojan War. He was also the father of Crete and of an illegitimate son Molus. In Diodorus's account, Deucalion and Molus were brothers and their sons Idomeneus and Meriones led the Cretans to Troy.

"Minos' sons, they say, were Deucalion and Molus, and to Deucalion was born Idomeneus and to Molus was born Meriones. These two joined with Agamemnon in the expedition against Ilium with ninety ships ..."

== Mythology ==
=== Theseus in Crete ===
It is said that when Theseus was about to leave Crete, he joined battle with the Cretans at the gate of the Labyrinth where he slew Deucalion and his bodyguard.

"And when Deucalion, his son [i.e. Minos], who was on hostile terms with the Athenians, sent to them a demand that they deliver up Daedalus to him, and threatened, if they refused, to put to death the youth whom Minos had received from them as hostages, Theseus made him a gentle reply, declining to surrender Daedalus, who was his kinsman and cousin ... Then joining battle with them at the gate of the Labyrinth, he [i.e. Theseus] slew Deucalion and his body-guard."

One source recounts a different relationship between Deucalion and Theseus:

While he [i.e. Deucalion] was ruler of Crete, formed an alliance with the Athenians and united his own sister Phaedra in marriage to Theseus.

=== Odysseus's lie ===
Odysseus pretends to be his second son Aethon when he speaks to his wife while in disguise. It is unclear whether Aethon is a real son of Deucalion, left by Idomeneus to act as regent during the war, or invented by Odysseus.
