= History of zoophilia and bestiality =

The history of zoophilia and bestiality begins in the prehistoric era, where depictions of humans and non-human animals in a sexual context appear infrequently in rock art. Bestiality remained a theme in mythology and folklore through the classical period and into the Middle Ages (e.g. the Greek myth of Leda and the Swan) and several ancient authors purported to document it as a regular, accepted practice—albeit usually in "other" cultures.

Explicit legal prohibition of human sexual contact with other animals is a legacy of the Abrahamic religions: the Hebrew Bible imposes the death penalty on both the person and animal involved in an act of bestiality. There are several examples known from medieval Europe of people and animals executed for committing bestiality. With the Age of Enlightenment, bestiality was subsumed with other sexual "crimes against nature" into civil sodomy laws, usually remaining a capital crime.

Bestiality remains illegal in most countries. Arguments used to justify this include: it is against religion, it is a "crime against nature," and that non-human animals cannot give consent and that sex with animals is inherently abusive. In common with many paraphilias, the internet has provided a connective platform for the zoophile community, which has lobbied for the recognition of zoophilia (or zoosexuality as an alternative sexuality), and advocated for the legalisation of bestiality.

== Prehistory ==
Depictions of human sexual activity with animals appear infrequently in prehistoric art. Possibly the oldest depiction, and the only known example from the Palaeolithic (prior to the Neolithic Revolution and the domestication of animals), is found in the Vale do Côa in Portugal. It shows a man with an exaggerated, erect penis juxtaposed with a goat. However, there is some doubt that the two figures are contemporary; while the goat is depicted in characteristic palaeolithic style, the scene may have been altered in a later period with the insertion of the human figure.

From the Neolithic onwards, images of zoophilia are slightly more common. Examples are found at Coren del Valento, a cave in Val Camonica, Italy, containing rock art dating from 10,000 BCE to as late as the Middle Ages, one depicting a man penetrating a horse, and Sagaholm, a Bronze Age cairn in Sweden where several petroglyphs have been found with similar scenes. Zoophilia has also been recorded in rock art in the Brazilian state of Piauí.

== Classical antiquity ==
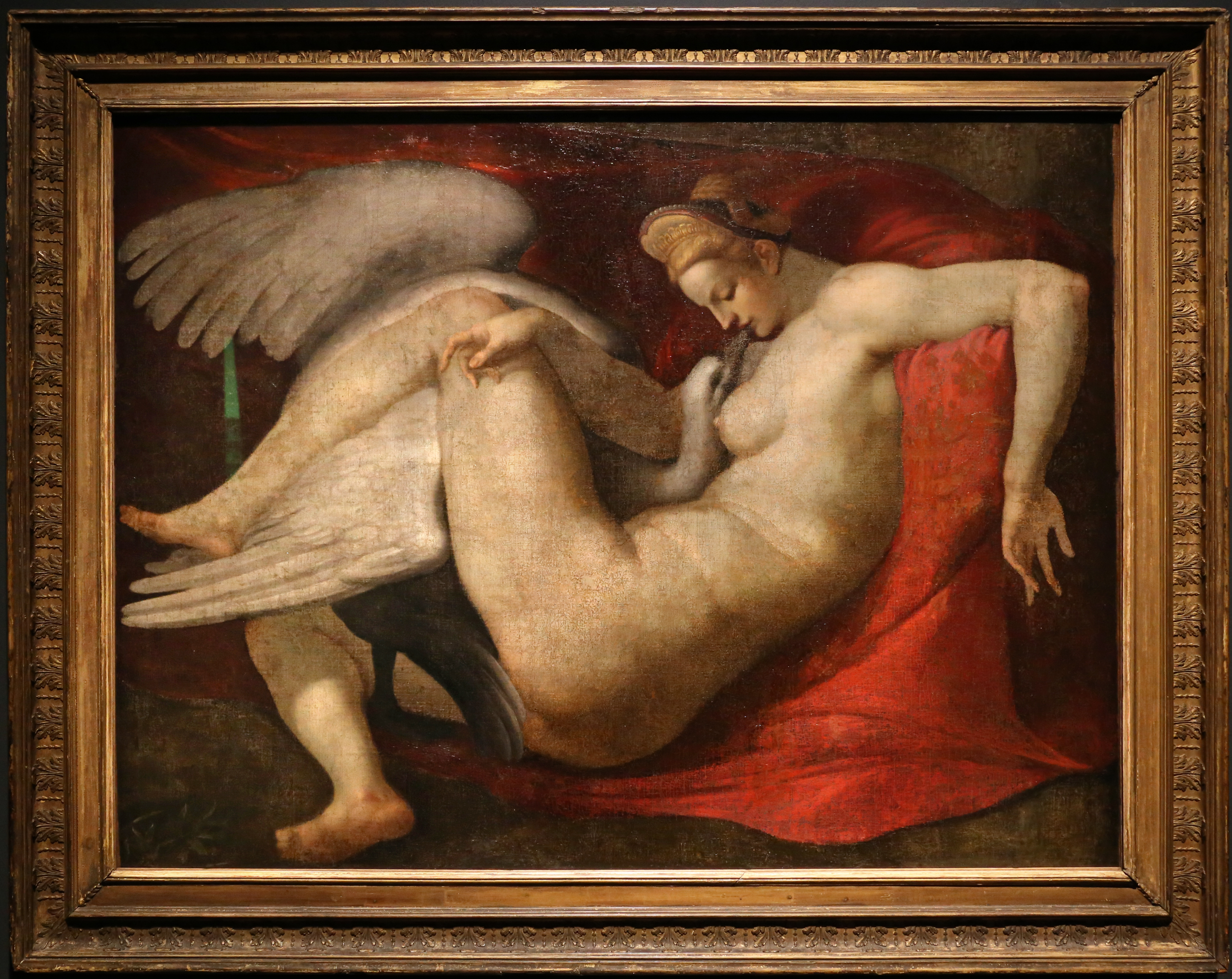
Leda and the Swan, copy of lost Michelangelo

Several Greek myths include the God Zeus seducing or abducting favoured mortals while in the form of an animal: Europa and the bull, Ganymede and the eagle, and Leda and the Swan. Only the latter legend includes actual copulation between Leda and Zeus in his animal form, but depictions of this act, fairly uncommon in antiquity, became a popular motif in classicising Renaissance art, contributing to a lasting prominence in Western culture. Another Greek myth tells of Pasiphaë who commissioned to build a wooden cow, a device that would enable her to have sex with a bull.

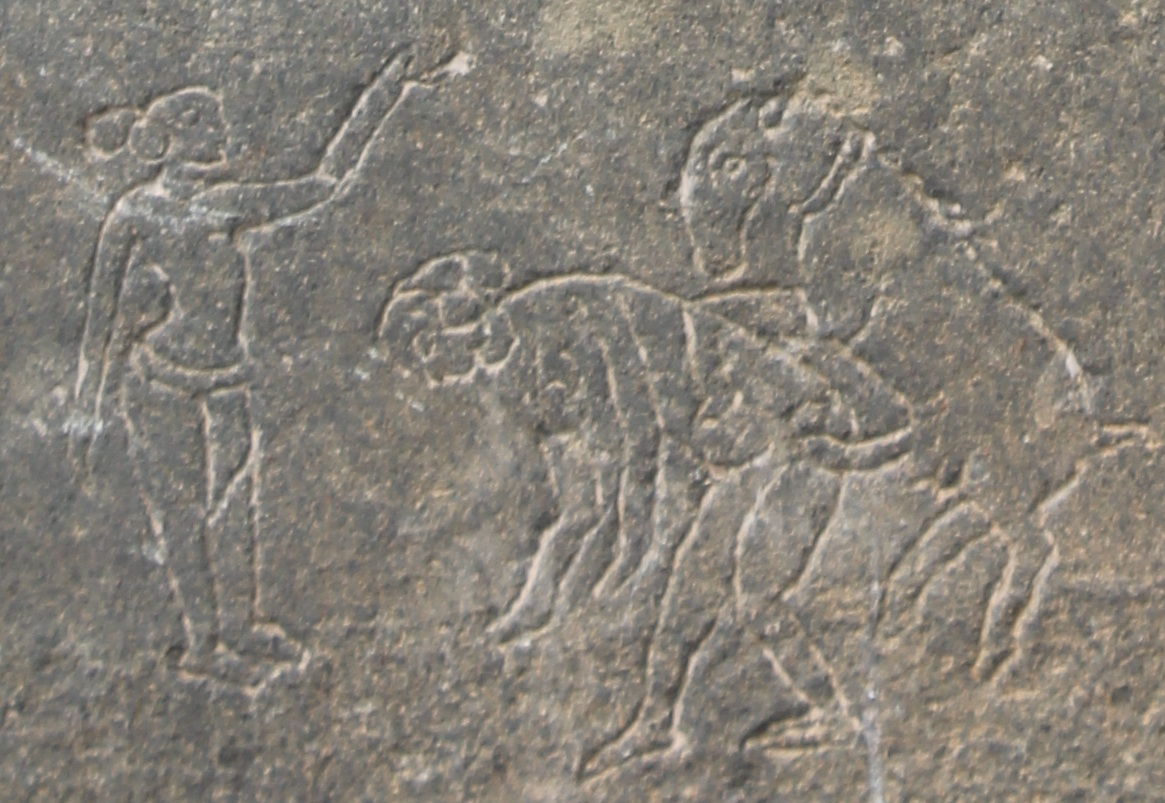
Zoophilia carving on Rock with Old Kannada script engraved at Kedareshvara Temple, Balligavi

Various classical writers recorded that bestiality was common in other cultures. Herodotus was followed by Pindar, Strabo and Plutarch in alleging that Egyptian women engaged in sexual relations with goats for religious and magical purposes – the animal aspects of Egyptian deities being particularly alien to the Greco-Roman world. Conversely, Plutarch and Virgil make similar accusations of the Greeks.

The Golden Ass, the only ancient Roman novel in Latin to survive in its entirety, describes a sexual encounter of a donkey and a willing woman; according to the story, another encounter was planned as an act of a public punishment for a female criminal.

Despite their place in mythology and literature, actual acts of bestiality were probably as uncommon in antiquity as they are today. Roman civil law, however, made no mention of it. The explicit prohibition of and strict penalties for zoophilia universal in later European legal systems were derived from Jewish and Christian tradition. The Hebrew Bible imposes the death penalty on both the human and animal parties involved in an act of bestiality: "if a man has sexual relations with an animal, he shall be put to death; and you shall kill the animal." The Synod of Ancyra in 313–316 discussed the position of the church with regard to bestiality at length and two of the resulting twenty-five canons addressed it: the sixteenth canon described the penance and level of restrictions to be applied to various age groups for committing bestiality; the seventeenth canon prohibited all lepers from praying inside church if they had committed bestiality while they suffered from leprosy.

Hittite law mandated the death penalty for intercourse with animals, excluding horses and mules (violators were instead barred from the priesthood and from approaching the king).

== Europe: Middle Ages ==
In the Church-oriented culture of the Middle Ages, zoophilic activity was met with execution, typically burning, and death to the animals involved either the same way or by hanging. Sects deemed heretical by the Church such as the Hussites were accused of bestiality. Masters comments that:

"Theologians, bowing to Biblical prohibitions and basing their judgements on the conception of man as a spiritual being and of the animal as a merely carnal one, have regarded the same phenomenon as both a violation of Biblical edicts and a degradation of man, with the result that the act of bestiality has been castigated and anathematized [...]"

In 1468, Jean Beisse, accused of bestiality with a cow on one occasion and a goat on another, was first hanged, then burned. The animals involved were also burned. In 1539, Guillaume Garnier, charged with intercourse with a female dog (described as "sodomy"), was ordered strangled after he confessed under torture. The dog was burned, along with the trial records which were "too horrible and potentially dangerous to be permitted to exist" (Masters). Other accusations of bestiality in the period include the trials of Thomas Weir and John Atherton. In 1601, Claudine de Culam, a young girl of sixteen, was convicted of copulating with a dog. Both the girl and the dog were first hanged, and finally burned. In 1735, François Borniche was charged with sexual intercourse with animals. It was greatly feared that "his infamous debauches may corrupt the young men." He was imprisoned, and there is no record of his release. Historians claim there were more than a thousand executions recorded for bestiality in Sweden throughout the 17th and 18th centuries.

On the other hand, other accounts are more possibly fictitious, such as Pietro Damiani's, who in his "De bono religiosi status et variorum animatium tropologia" (11th century) tells of a Count Gulielmus whose pet ape became his wife's lover. One day the ape became so "mad with jealousy" on seeing the count lying with his wife that it fatally attacked him. Damiani claims he was told about this incident by Pope Alexander II and shown an offspring claimed to be that of the ape and woman. (Illustrated Book of Sexual Records)

Clergyman and chronicler Gerald of Wales claimed to have witnessed a man having intercourse with a horse as part of a pagan ritual in Ireland.

Although thousands of female witches were accused of having sex with animals, usually said to be the Devil in animal form or their familiars, court records available in Europe and the United States, dating back to the 14th century and continuing into the 20th century, nearly always show males, rather than females, as the human parties in court cases. (Encyclopedia of Human Sexuality, Humboldt University)

== French Revolution and legal reform ==
From at least the 13th century and until the French Revolution, French criminal law had theoretically punished bestiality with death (burning at the stake), although in practice law courts only occasionally meted out that penalty. When the revolutionary politicians of the National Constituent Assembly set out to remake French government and society, their reforms included new criminal laws liberalizing sexual activities, inspired by ideas of the 18th-century Enlightenment. In 1791, Louis-Michel Le Peletier de Saint-Fargeau presented a newly drafted penal code to the National Constituent Assembly. He explained that it outlawed only "true crimes" and not "phoney offenses, created by superstition, feudalism, the tax system, and [royal] despotism." Zoophilia was not mentioned in the new Penal Code (promulgated September 26-October 6, 1791) and thus decriminalized it.

== 19th century ==
In 1835, the Russian Empire criminalized skotolozhstvo (bestiality) in the country. In 1845, the Russian Empire merged both muzhelozhstvo (sodomy) and skotolozhstvo statutes together into a single statute prohibiting protivoestestvennye poroki (vices contrary to nature). On August 20, 1848, Norway adopted new penal codes which replaced a 1687 law that implemented the capital punishment by burning for "intercourse which is against nature" (bestiality) and reduced the punishment for engaging in bestiality from capital punishment to a sentence of hard labor of the fifth degree.

In 1855, the German physician Wilhelm Gollmann claimed that sodomy was initially committed by shepherds. He adds that shepherds were drawn to this method of pleasure for the "want of more natural opportunities." Gollmann then prejudicially attacks Sicilians, whom he claims commit zoophilia against goats. According to Blumenbach, the females of Guinea commit indecent acts against monkeys. Gollmann finalizes his dubious claims with his assertion that Iranians commit acts against donkeys as a cure for coxalgia.

In 1852, the Austrian Empire enacted § 130 which criminalized bestiality with a maximum of five years in prison. About fifty people were convicted annually due to the law. In 1861, the Offences against the Person Act 1861 lowered the criminal penalty of buggery in the United Kingdom from the death penalty to life in prison. On February 10, 1866, Denmark (including Greenland and Faroes) adopted new penal codes which replaced a 1683 law that implemented the death penalty at the stake by means of royal pardon for "intercourse against nature" (bestiality) and reduced the punishment for engaging in bestiality from capital punishment to a sentence of hard labor ranging from about eight months to six years, which was further reduced with about one third if the penalty was served in solitude. On June 25, 1869, Iceland adopted a new penal code that replaced a 13th-century law mandating death by burning for "intercourse which is against nature" (bestiality) to a punishment of work in a house of correction.

On May 15, 1871, the German Empire enacted Paragraph 175 into the "Reichs-Criminal Code" (RStGB) which outlawed zoophilia and punished it by imprisonment. In 1878, the penal code of the Kingdom of Hungary criminalized bestiality with a maximum of one year in prison. Sweden, in 1864, and Grand Duchy of Finland, on December 19, 1889, adopted new penal codes replacing a 1734 penal code, which applied to both countries and criminalized bestiality with being burnt at the stake. The 1864 Swedish law punished "fornication with animals" (bestiality) with two years hard labor, while the 1889 Finnish law punished bestiality with imprisonment for two years.

== 1900–present (occurrences) ==
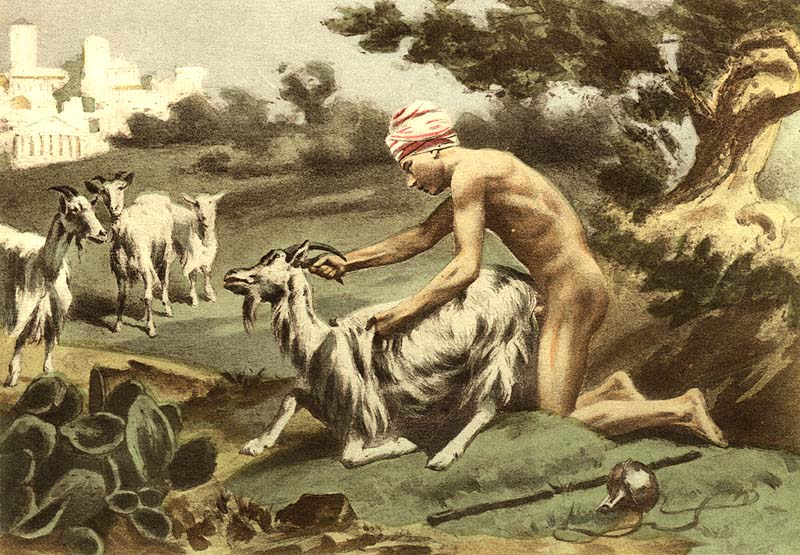
Plate XVII by Édouard-Henri Avril, De Figuris Veneris (1906)

Sex with animals, particularly dogs, was a documented feature of the torture committed in Chile under the rule of Augusto Pinochet (1973–1990). Victims testified that they were raped by dogs. Amnesty International and other sources report that the dogs had been trained specifically to have sex with humans. One of the most notorious agents who participated in this torture was Ingrid Olderock, also known as "the Dog lady". Olderock trained her German Shepherd named Volodia to rape female left-wing prisoners.

In 1987, a witness testified that Nazi officer Klaus Barbie tried to have a girl raped by a German Shepherd during World War II.

In 2013, Vice Media reported on a female sex worker in Holland who trains dogs to have sex with her clients, saying it takes about 6 months to train a dog to get accustomed to having sex with human females.

In 2017, numerous media outlets (including The Daily Mirror) reported on the presence of numerous animal brothels in Belgrade, Serbia. According to these outlets, Belgrade was developing into a zoophilic hot spot, where tourists from all over Europe travel to sleep with animals.

In 2024, Adam Britton was jailed after he admitted to sexually abusing dogs.

== 1900–present (legal status) ==
On June 28, 1935, Nazi Germany enacted legislation that created a separate category in Paragraph 175 for "fornication with animals" and penalized with up to five years in prison.

During the 20th century, zoophilia was legalized in the Russian Empire in 1903, in Denmark (including Greenland and Faroes) on January 1, 1933, in Iceland on August 12, 1940, in Sweden in 1944, in Hungarian People's Republic in 1961, in West Germany in 1969, in Austria in 1971, in Finland on January 15, 1971, and Norway on April 21, 1972.

In 2003, the Sexual Offences Act 2003 lowered the criminal penalty of bestiality in the United Kingdom from life in prison to two years in prison.

In 2006, Denmark's Council for Animal Ethics said there was no need to ban bestiality unless it took place in pornographic films or sex shows. Only one of the 10 members of the council, set up by the Danish Justice Ministry to establish and uphold animal ethics, wanted bestiality expressly prohibited. The other members said current laws provided enough animal protection. Denmark outlawed bestiality in 2015 after all parties except the Liberal Alliance voted in support of a ban, leaving Hungary, Finland and Romania as the only European Union countries without bans on bestiality.

During the 21st century, bestiality was re-criminalized in the following countries or territories:

United States of America: Iowa (illegal since 2001), Maine (illegal since 2001), Oregon (illegal since 2001), Illinois (illegal since January 1, 2003), Maryland (illegal since October 1, 2002), South Dakota (illegal since July 1, 2003), Washington (illegal since June 7, 2006), Arizona (illegal since September 21, 2006), Colorado (illegal since July 1, 2007), Indiana (illegal since July 1, 2007), Tennessee (illegal since July 1, 2007), Alaska (illegal since September 13, 2010), Florida (illegal since October 1, 2011), and New Mexico (since June 2023).

Outside the United States of America:

France (illegal since March 10, 2004), Belgium (illegal since May 11, 2007), Netherlands (illegal since 2010), Norway (illegal since January 1, 2010), Australian Capital Territory (illegal since 2011), Germany (illegal since 2013), Sweden (illegal since January 1, 2014), Denmark (illegal since April 2015),

== See also ==
- Human–animal marriage
- Humanzee
- Human–animal hybrid
- Anthrozoology
- History of sex
