= Molus (mythology) =

In Greek mythology, the name Molus (/ˈmoʊləs/; Ancient Greek: Μῶλος or Μόλος, romanized: Mōlos or Mólos, lit. 'toil and moil', 'struggle', or 'fight') may refer to one of the following characters:

- Molus, son of Ares and Demonice, daughter of Agenor.
- Molus, son of Deucalion, son of Minos.
- Molus, an Argive soldier.
