= Phaedra (mythology) =

Cretan princess in Greek mythology

- Queen of Athens
- Member of the Cretean Royal Family
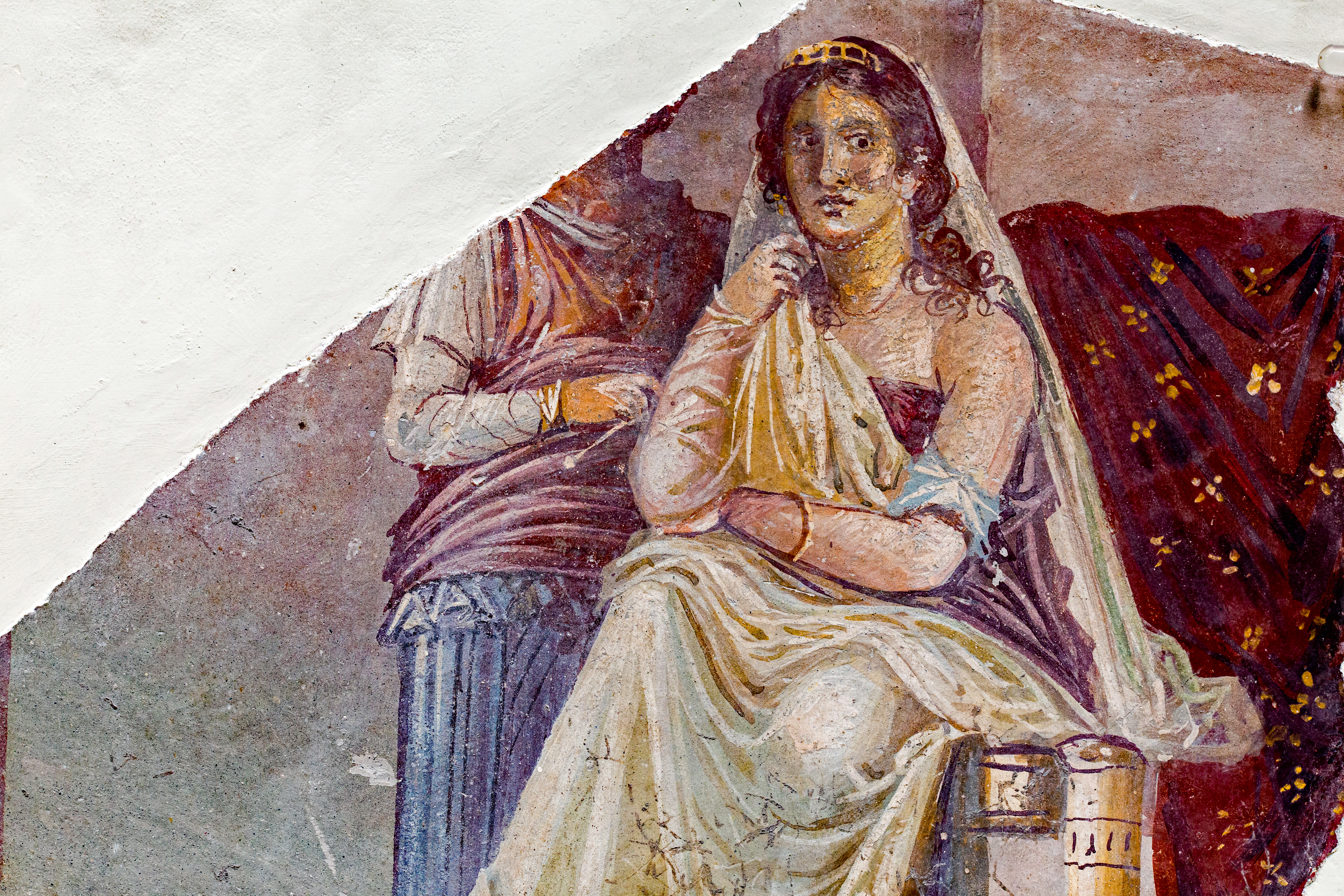
- Phaedra with an attendant, probably her nurse. Fresco from Pompeii, 60–20 BC
- Abode: Crete, later Athens

Genealogy
- Parents: Minos and Pasiphae or Crete
- Siblings: Catreus, Ariadne, Androgeus, Xenodice, Acacallis, Glaucus and Deucalion; the Minotaur
- Spouse: Theseus
- Offspring: Acamas and Demophon

In Greek mythology, Phaedra (/ˈfiːdrə, ˈfɛdrə/; Ancient Greek: Φαίδρα, romanized: Phaídra) was a Cretan princess. Her name derives from the Greek word φαιδρός (phaidros), which means "bright". According to legend, she was the daughter of Minos and Pasiphaë, and the wife of Theseus. Later in life, Phaedra fell in love with her stepson, Hippolytus. After he rejected her advances, she accused him of trying to rape her. In response, Theseus prayed to Poseidon and asked the god to kill Hippolytus, which he did. Phaedra then committed suicide.

The story of Phaedra is told in Euripides's play Hippolytus, Seneca the Younger's Phaedra, and Ovid's Heroides. It has inspired many modern works of art and literature, including a play by Jean Racine.

== Mythology ==
=== Family ===
Phaedra was a daughter of King Minos and Queen Pasiphaë of Crete, who had a total of eight children together. This included three daughters: Acacallis, Ariadne, and Xenodice, and four sons: Androgeus, Deucalion, Glaucus and Catreus. Additionally, the Minotaur would have been her maternal half-brother and she had several paternal half-siblings.

Phaedra was the wife of Theseus, a Greek hero and the legendary founder of Athens. She gave birth to two sons: Demophon and Acamas. Before Theseus married Phaedra, he had a son, Hippolytus, with the queen of the Amazons, either Hippolyta or Antiope.

=== Marriage to Theseus ===
Theseus married Phaedra some time after he aided Heracles in stealing the belt of Hippolyta, killed the Minotaur, and returned to Athens with her. During the journey to steal the belt from the Amazons, Theseus carried off Hippolyta (or Antiope) and she bore him a son, Hippolytus. Alternately, Hippolyta fell in love with Theseus and left with him voluntarily. When Theseus and Phaedra were celebrating their marriage at a feast, a group of the Amazons led by Hippolyta attacked the hall where the reception was being held. During the ensuing fight, Theseus killed Hippolyta.

=== Relationship with Hippolytus ===
Much of what we know about the mythology and story of Phaedra is from a collection of ancient Greek and Roman plays and poems. Many of these earlier sources such as Phaedra, a play by Sophocles, and Hippolytus Veiled, a play by Euripides, have been lost. However, works such as Phaedra, written by Roman statesman and philosopher Seneca the Younger, Heroides, a collection of poems written by Ovid, and Hippolytus, a play by Euripides, give details of the story. As a result, there are many different versions of the story of Phaedra and Hippolytus, but they all share the same general structure, with two distinct versions becoming more prominent over time: one where Phaedra acts alone on her desires, and one where she is cursed by Aphrodite to fall in love with her stepson.

==== Phaedra alone acts upon her illicit desires ====
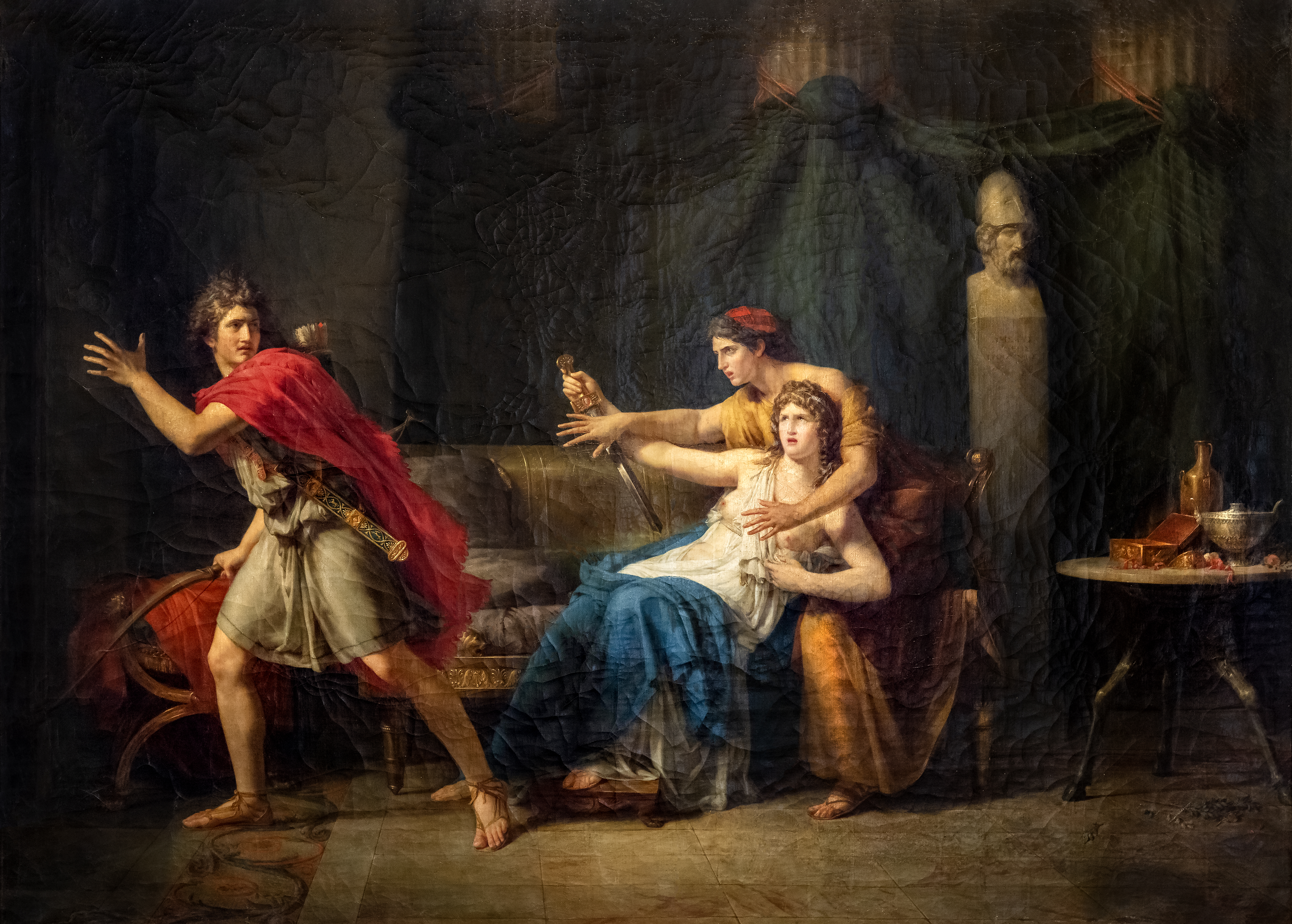
Hippolytus after the confession of Phaedra by Étienne-Barthélémy Garnier; Musée Ingres, Montauban

In the more traditional version of the story, Phaedra is the primary cause of misfortune in the tale. In the story, Phaedra falls in love with her stepson Hippolytus and decides that she will try to entice him into a sexual relationship. However, Hippolytus refused because he was a follower of Artemis, and had sworn to preserve his virginity. Phaedra was humiliated when he refused her advances. However, she was aware of the consequences she would suffer if Theseus learned about her actions. She lied to her husband and claimed that Hippolytus attempted to rape her. Theseus was angered by Hippolytus's supposed actions and cursed his son with one of the three wishes granted to him by Poseidon. Poseidon granted this wish. While Hippolytus was riding in his chariot along the seashore, Poseidon sent up a monster or sea-bull from the sea, which scared the horses. The horses panicked and began to run off with the chariot, dashing it to pieces. Hippolytus, who was tangled in the reins, was dragged to death.

In the end, Phaedra's treachery is discovered, and she hangs herself.

==== Phaedra is cursed by Aphrodite ====
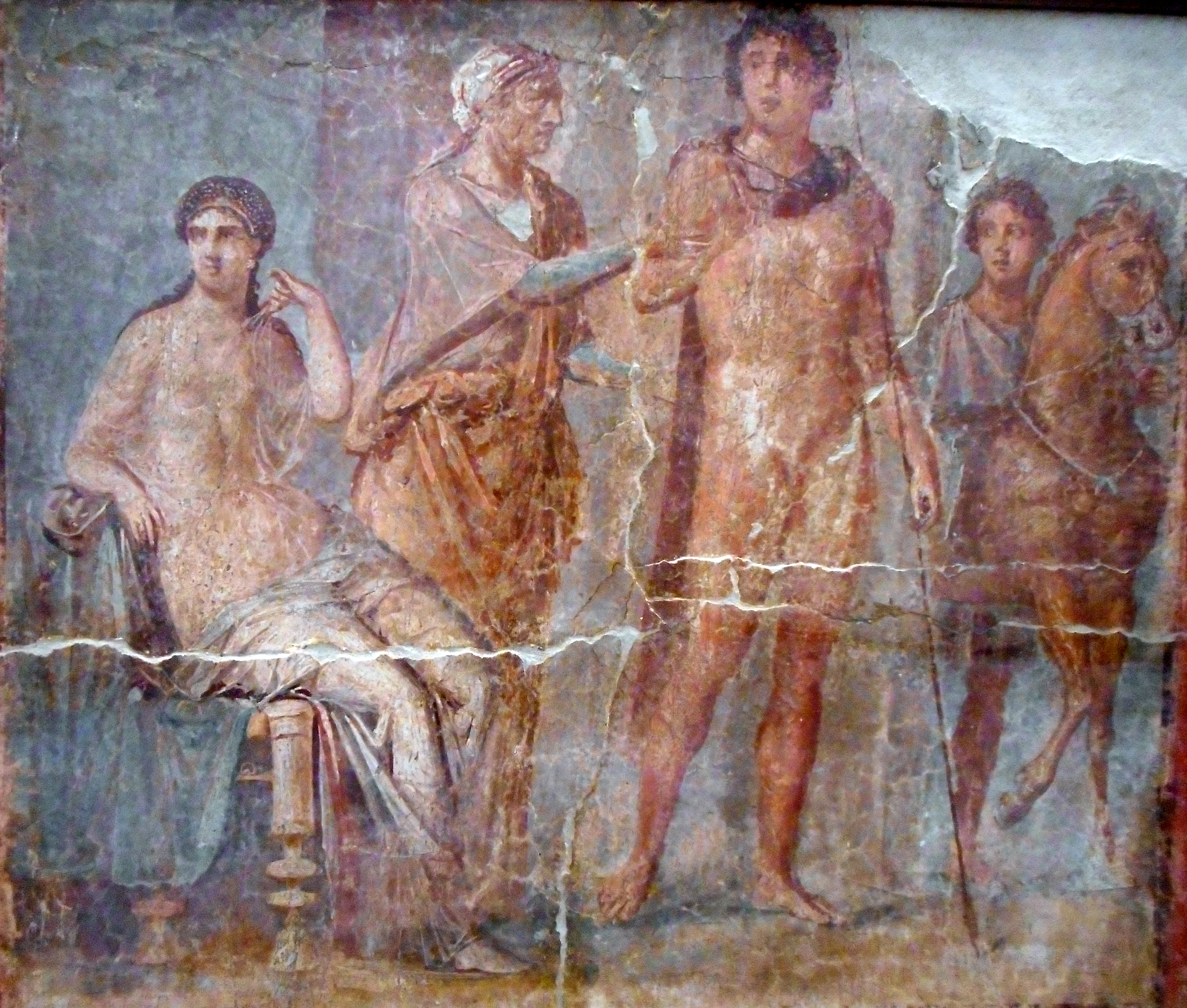
Hippolytus, Phaedra and nurse, antique fresco in Herculaneum

In this version of the story popularized by Euripides, Phaedra has a reputation as a virtuous queen and is not entirely responsible for her actions. She gets caught in the crossfire between Hippolytus and Aphrodite, the goddess of love. Hippolytus is a devout follower of Artemis, a virgin goddess. He hails her as the greatest of all deities and in a show of devotion to honor the goddess, Hippolytus vows eternal chastity, swearing that he will never love or marry. He additionally refuses to worship Aphrodite. This offends the goddess, and to punish Hippolytus, she curses Phaedra to fall madly in love with him. Theseus was abroad at the time.

Phaedra becomes depressed for several months due to her longing for Hippolytus, lying in her bed and refusing to eat. Eventually, unable to tolerate the burden of her suffering in silence, she confides in her nurse and shares her feelings towards Hippolytus. The nurse concerned about her mistress's health tells Hippolytus about how Phaedra feels. Bound by his oath of abstinence, Hippolytus rejects his stepmother. When Phaedra learns of her nurse's actions, she fears the consequences of her immoral desires and plans to commit suicide. But before doing so, she writes a letter to her husband Theseus accusing Hippolytus of seducing and assaulting her in an attempt to clear her name and possibly protect her children from misfortune. She commits suicide by hanging herself, holding the letter in her hand.

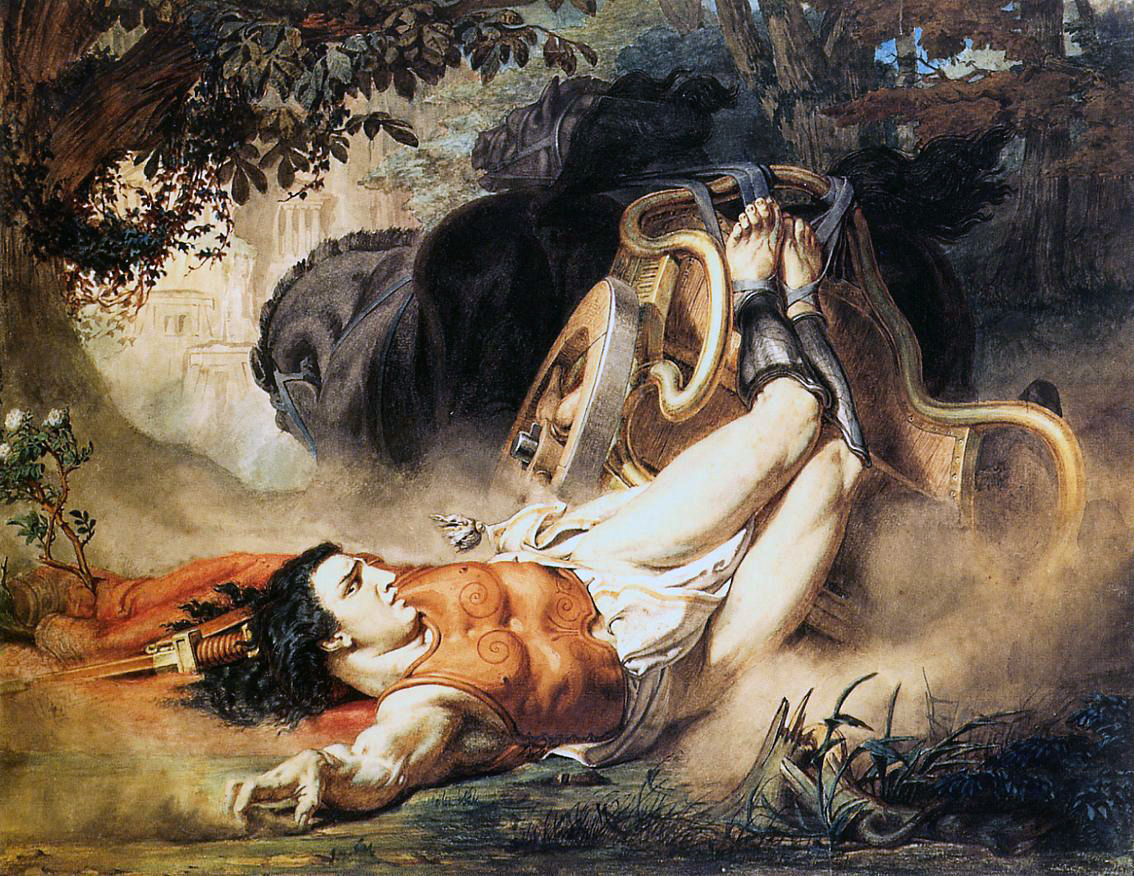
The Death of Hippolytus (1860) by Sir Lawrence Alma-Tadema

Similar to the more common version of the story, once Theseus reads Phaedra's letter and learns of his son's supposed sins, he prays to Poseidon to kill his son. Poseidon summons a huge bull to scare Hippolytus's horses into a wild frenzy. The horses drag Hippolytus to his death. Artemis is saddened by the loss of her devout follower and tells Theseus about the curse Aphrodite placed on his wife. The story ends with Theseus grieving the deaths of his wife and son.

==== After death ====
The Athenians maintained a shrine on the south slope of the Acropolis devoted to Aphrodite "for Hippolytus". Pausanias writes that Phaedra and Hippolytus were buried close to each other, near to a racetrack where Hippolytus used to practice. He states that there was a myrtle tree that grew over her tomb. He intertwines her story with this species of tree, claiming that she would hide behind a myrtle while watching him practice. He writes that the Troezenians had a myrtle with all of its leaves pierced with holes, which they claimed were pierced by a pin in Phaedra's hair while she was watching. In Book VI of the Roman poet Virgil's Aeneid, Phaedra is one of the inhabitants of the "Mourning Fields" (Lugentes Campi), a region of the underworld visited by Aeneas.

== Cultural influence ==
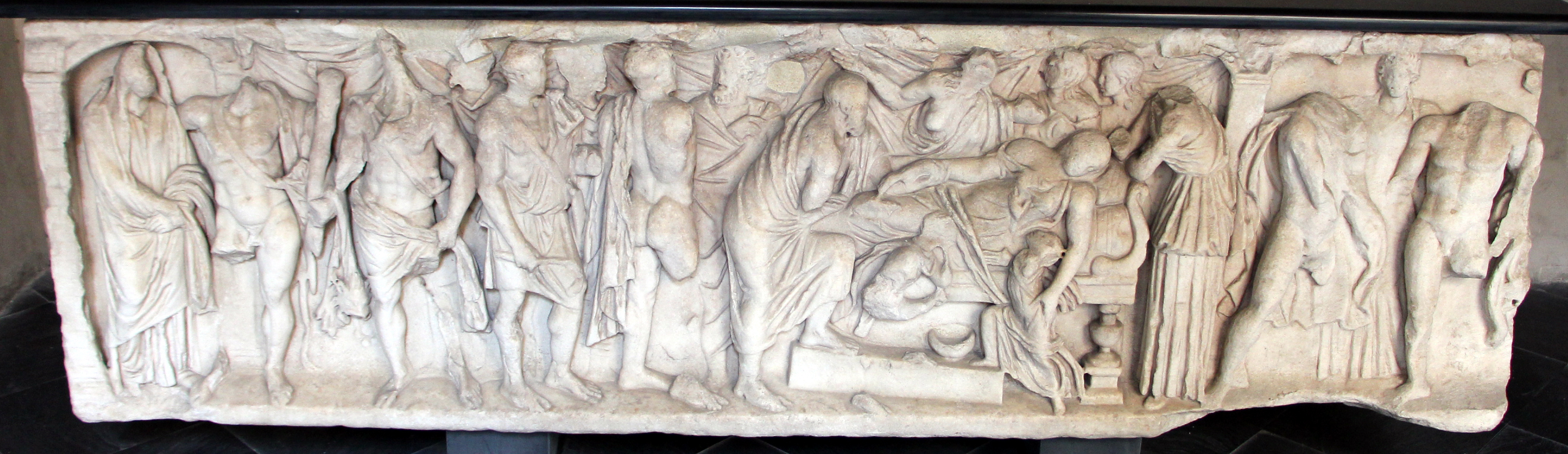
Death of Phaedra; 2nd century sarcophagus, Santa Maria delle Vigne, Genoa

Phaedra has been the subject of many notable works of art, literature, music and film.

=== In art ===
- Figure 8 Phaedra, wall painting, early first century CE, Pompeii, now Antiquarium di Pompeii, Pompeii, inv. no. 20620,
- Second century Roman Sarcophagus of Beatrice of Lorraine in the Camposanto in Pisa. This was the model for Nicola Pisano's work on the Pisa Baptistery in the mid-thirteenth century.
- Alexandre Cabanel's Phaedra (1880)

=== In literature ===
Phaedra's story appears in many acclaimed works of literature, including:

- Euripides, Hippolytus, Greek play
- Ovid, Heroides IV, Epistolary poetry
- Seneca the Younger, Phaedra, Latin play
- Jean Racine, Phèdre (1677), French play
- Algernon Charles Swinburne, Phaedra (1866), English lyrical drama
- Herman Bang, Fædra (1883), Danish novel.
- Thomas Sturge Moore, Aphrodite against Artemis (1901), English play
- Willa Cather, The Marriage of Phaedra (1905), American short story
- Gabriele D'Annunzio, Fedra (1909), Italian play
- Miguel de Unamuno, Fedra (1911), Spanish play
- Eugene O'Neill, Desire Under the Elms (1924), American play
- Marina Tsvetaeva, Fedra (1928), Russian play
- Mary Renault, The Bull from the Sea (1962), English novel
- Sarah Kane, Phaedra's Love (1996), English play

=== In music ===
Phaedra is also the subject of a number of musical works, including:

- Hippolyte et Aricie, opera (tragédie en musique) by Jean-Philippe Rameau, 1733
- Phèdre, opera by Jean-Baptiste Lemoyne, 1786
- Fedra, opera by Giovanni Paisiello, 1788
- Fedra, opera by Simon Mayr, 1820
- Phèdre, overture by Jules Massenet, 1873. Also appears as a protagonist in his 1907 opera Ariane
- Fedra, opera by Ildebrando Pizzetti, 1915, based on D'Annunzio's 1909 play
- Some Velvet Morning, song by Lee Hazelwood and Nancy Sinatra, 1967
- Phaedra, LP recorded by Tangerine Dream, 1974
- Phaedra (cantata) by Benjamin Britten, 1975
- Phaedra, opera by Hans Werner Henze, 2007
- Tragedy, avant-pop album by Julia Holter, 2011

== See also ==
Other women who falsely accused men of rape:

- Philonome
- Phthia
- Ochne
- Demodice
- Astydamia
