= Asterion (king of Crete) =

Mythical King of Crete

In Greek mythology, Asterion (/əˈstɪriən/; Ancient Greek: Ἀστερίων, gen.: Ἀστερίωνος, literally "starry") or Asterius (/əˈstɪriəs/; Ἀστέριος) was a King of Crete and the foster-father of Minos.

== Mythology ==
Asterion was the son of Tectamus (son of Dorus) and the unnamed daughter of Cretheus. His father sailed to Crete with some Aeolians and Pelasgians and became the ruler of the island. Asterion inherited the throne from his father and he was the king of Crete at the time when Europa was abducted by Zeus and brought to his kingdom. He married Europa and became the stepfather of her sons by Zeus, who assumed the form of a bull (not to be confused with the Cretan Bull that was sire to the minotaur) to accomplish his role. Asterion brought up his stepsons: Minos, the just king in Crete who judged the Underworld; Rhadamanthus, presiding over the Blessed Island or in the Underworld; and Sarpedon, king in Lycia. When he died without male heirs, Asterion gave his kingdom to Minos, who promptly "banished" his brothers after quarreling with them. Crete, daughter of Asterion, was a possible wife of Minos.
