= Glaucus (son of Minos) =

Cretan prince, son of Minos

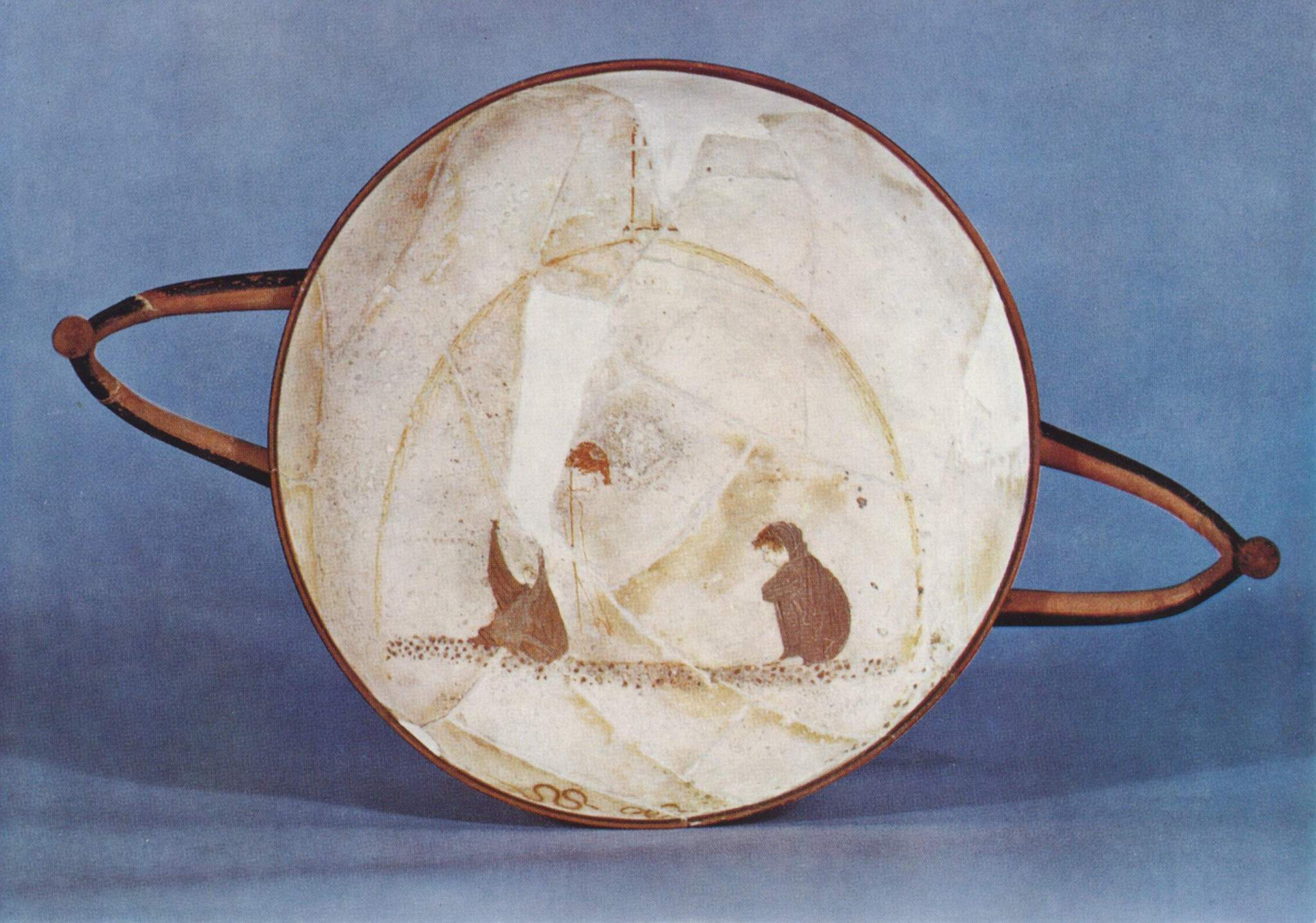
Glaucus (right) depicted on an Attic white-ground kylix, c. 460–450 BC, attributed to the Sotades Painter

In Greek mythology, Glaucus (/ˈɡlɔːkəs/; Ancient Greek: Γλαῦκος, romanized: Glaûkos, lit. 'shiny', 'bright' or 'glimmering') was a Cretan prince as the son of King Minos.

== Family ==
Glaucus's mother was Queen Pasiphaë, daughter of Helios, and thus, brother to Acacallis, Ariadne, Androgeus, Deucalion, Phaedra, Xenodice, and Catreus.

== Mythology ==
One day, while playing with a ball or chasing a mouse Glaucus fell into a jar of honey and died.

Unable to find their son, his parents went to the Oracle at Delphi who told them "A marvelous creature has been born amongst you: whoever finds the true likeness for this creature will also find the child." They interpreted this to refer to a newborn calf in Minos's herd. Three times a day, the calf changed color from white to red to black. Polyidus (or Asclepius, god of medicine) observed the similarity to the ripening of the fruit of the mulberry plant, and Minos sent him to find Glaucus.

Searching for the boy, Polyidus saw an owl driving bees away from a wine-cellar in Minos's palace. Inside the wine-cellar was a cask of honey, with Glaucus dead inside. Minos demanded Glaucus be brought back to life, though Polyidus objected. Minos ordered Polyidus to be entombed with the body. When a snake appeared nearby, Polyidus killed it immediately. Another snake came for the first, and after seeing its mate dead, the second serpent left and brought back a herb which then brought the first snake back to life. Following this example, Polyidus used the same herb to resurrect Glaucus.

Minos refused to let Polyidus leave Crete until he taught Glaucus the art of divination. Polyidus did so, but then, at the last second before leaving, he asked Glaucus to spit in his mouth. Glaucus did so and forgot everything he had been taught. The story of Polyidus and Glaucus was the subject of a lost play attributed to Euripides. Glaucus later led an army that attacked Italy, introducing to them the military girdle and shield. This was the source of his Italian name, Labicus, meaning "girdled".

Glaucus had a daughter called Deiphobe, who was a priestess of Phoebus Apollo and Diana Trivia who features in The Aeneid in Book 6.

== See also ==
- Damasen, a mythological figure whose myth also included a snake resurrecting another snake with a herb
- Tiresias
