= Androgeus (Aeneid) =

Character in the Aeneid

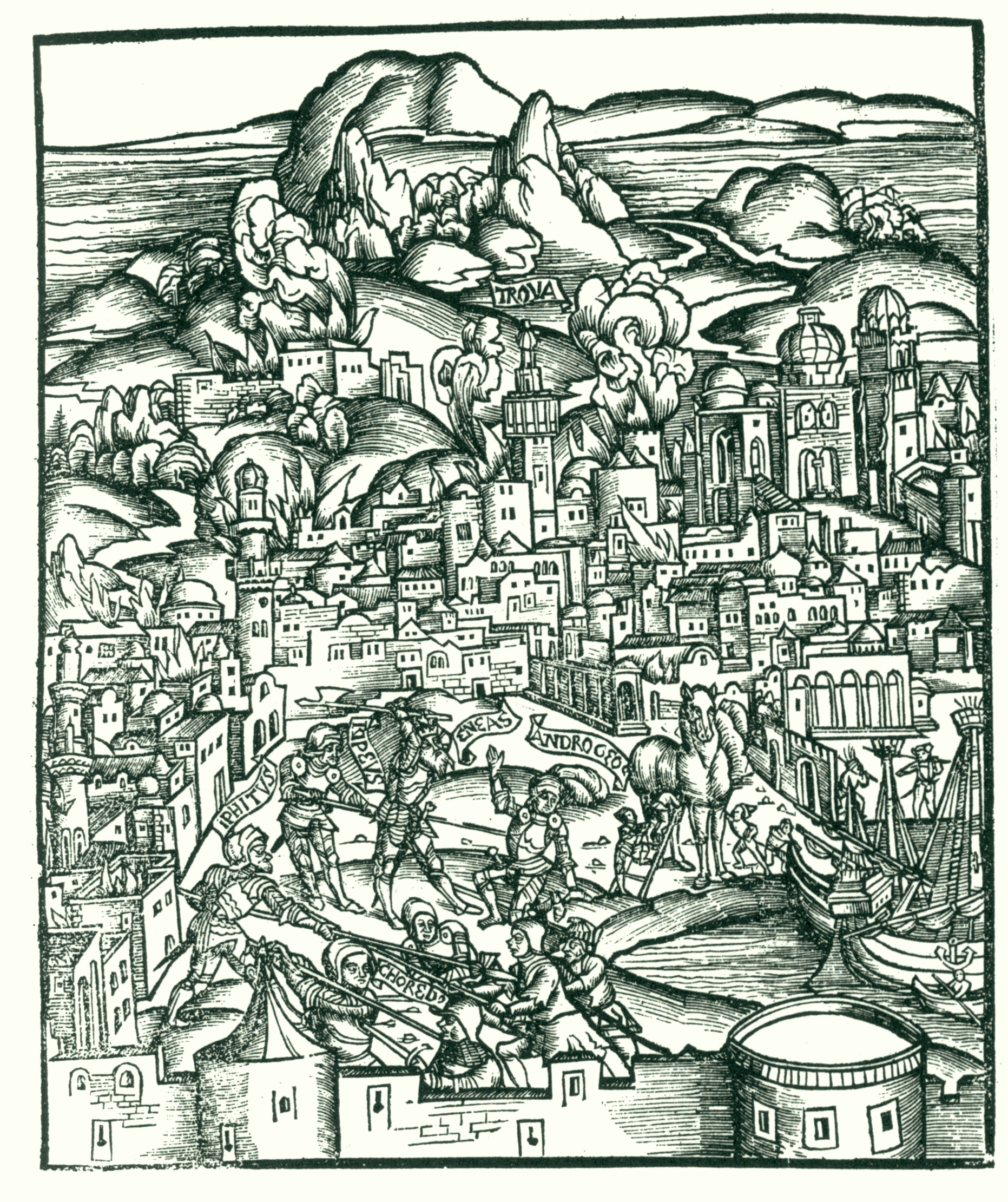
16th century woodcut depicting Aeneas's ambush of Androgeos.

In Virgil's Aeneid, Androgeos or Androgeus (Ancient Greek: Ἀνδρόγεως, romanized: Androgeōs; derived from andros "of a man" and geos, genitive gē "earth, land") was a Greek soldier, who during the sack of Troy in the middle of the night mistook Aeneas and his group of Trojan defenders for a Greek raiding party, paying for this mistake with his life. Afterwards, Aeneas's companion Coroebus dressed in Androgeos's armor in order to fool more Greek soldiers to their demise, only to be the first among Aeneas's disguised group to die.

== See also ==
- List of Trojan asteroids (Greek camp)
