= Androgeus (son of Minos) =

Mythical son of Minos

In Greek mythology, Androgeus or Androgeos (Ancient Greek: Ἀνδρόγεως, Latin: Androgeum or Androgeōs derived from andros "of a man" and geos, genitive gē "earth, land") was a Cretan prince as the son of King Minos.

== Family ==
Androgeus's mother was Pasiphaë, daughter of Helios. He was the brother of Acacallis, Ariadne, Deucalion, Phaedra, Glaucus, Catreus and Xenodice. Androgeus's sons were Sthenelus and Alcaeus, who later became companions of Heracles.

== Mythology ==
Androgeus was murdered in Athens, though sources vary as to the exact circumstances of his death. Some stated that Androgeus participated in the Panathenaic Games and took all the prizes, whereupon he was directed to Thebes to take part in another contest in honor of Laius, but was ambushed and killed by his envious would-be competitors. Servius suggests that Androgeus was murdered upon his triumph by the Athenians themselves and the Megarians. Plutarch writes that Androgeus "was thought to have been treacherously killed", without clarifying whether this was supposed to be the truth or not. In another version, Aegeus, King of Athens, sent him against the Marathonian Bull, which resulted in Androgeus's death. In Pausanias's interpretation, Androgeus being killed by the bull is presented as more of an accident, which, however, Minos is remarked not to have believed. According to Diodorus Siculus, Aegeus killed Androgeus out of fear that the latter would support the sons of Pallas against him. In yet another version, Androgeus was killed in a battle between the Athenians and the Cretans.

The Athenians eventually established a hero cult of Androgeus; there was an altar dedicated to him at Phaleron.

The consequences of Androgeus's death are described in the Bibliotheca as follows. Minos received the news of his son's death when he was performing a sacrificial rite in honor of the Charites at Paros. Overcome by grief, he threw off his garland and ordered for the music to stop, but he did complete the sacrifice, from which circumstance the festivals in honor of the Charites at Paros involved no music or flowers from then on. Minos led a war against Athens to avenge the death of his son, but he failed to sack the city and prayed to Zeus that the Athenians may be punished. The city was struck with famine and pestilence. The Athenians consulted an oracle as to how to avert the calamity, and were instructed to sacrifice the daughters of Hyacinthus the Lacedaemonian, but this did not help. The citizens consulted the oracle once again and were told to give Minos whatever he might ask in retribution. The king obliged the Athenians to send several youths every seven or nine years to be devoured by the Minotaur. This continued until the Minotaur was killed by Theseus.

Propertius in one of his elegies refers to a version in which Androgeus was brought back to life by Asclepius.
