= Minos =

Mythological king of Crete

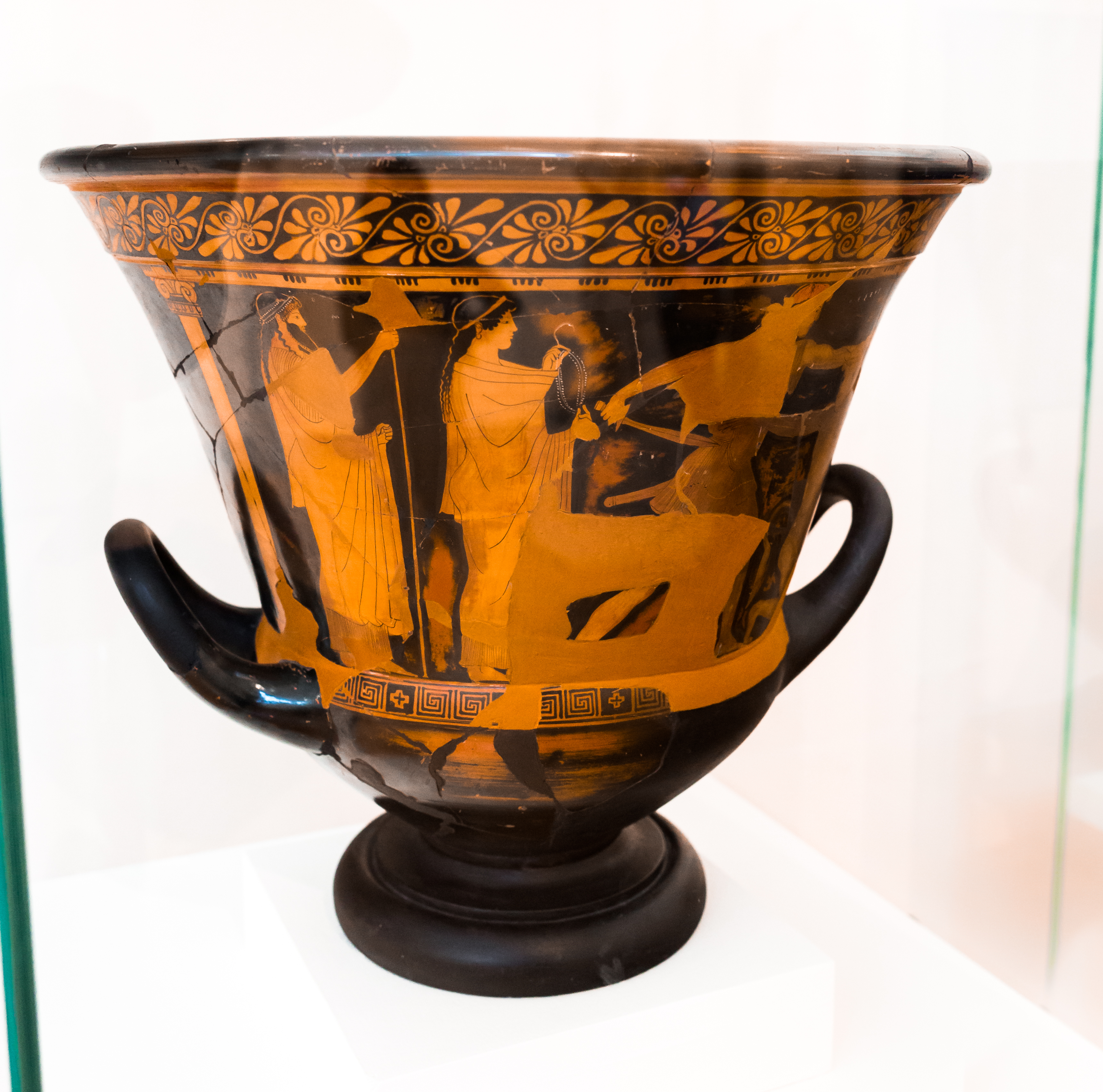
Minos witnesses the killing of the Minotaur on an Attic red-figure calyx-krater by the Syriskos Painter, c. 500-475 BC, National Archaeological Museum of Greece.

In Greek mythology, Minos (/ˈmaɪnɒs, -nəs/; Ancient Greek: Μίνως, romanized: Mī́nōs or Minôs, lit. 'king' or 'ruler', [mǐːnɔːs]) was a king of Crete, son of Zeus and Europa. Every nine years, he made King Aegeus pick seven young boys and seven young girls to be sent to Daedalus's creation, the labyrinth, to be eaten by the Minotaur. After his death, King Minos became a judge of the dead in the underworld alongside Rhadamanthus and Aeacus.

Archeologist Sir Arthur Evans used King Minos as the namesake for the Minoan civilization of Crete. The Minoan palace at Knossos is sometimes referred to as the Palace of Minos though there is no evidence that Minos was a real person.

== Literary Minos ==
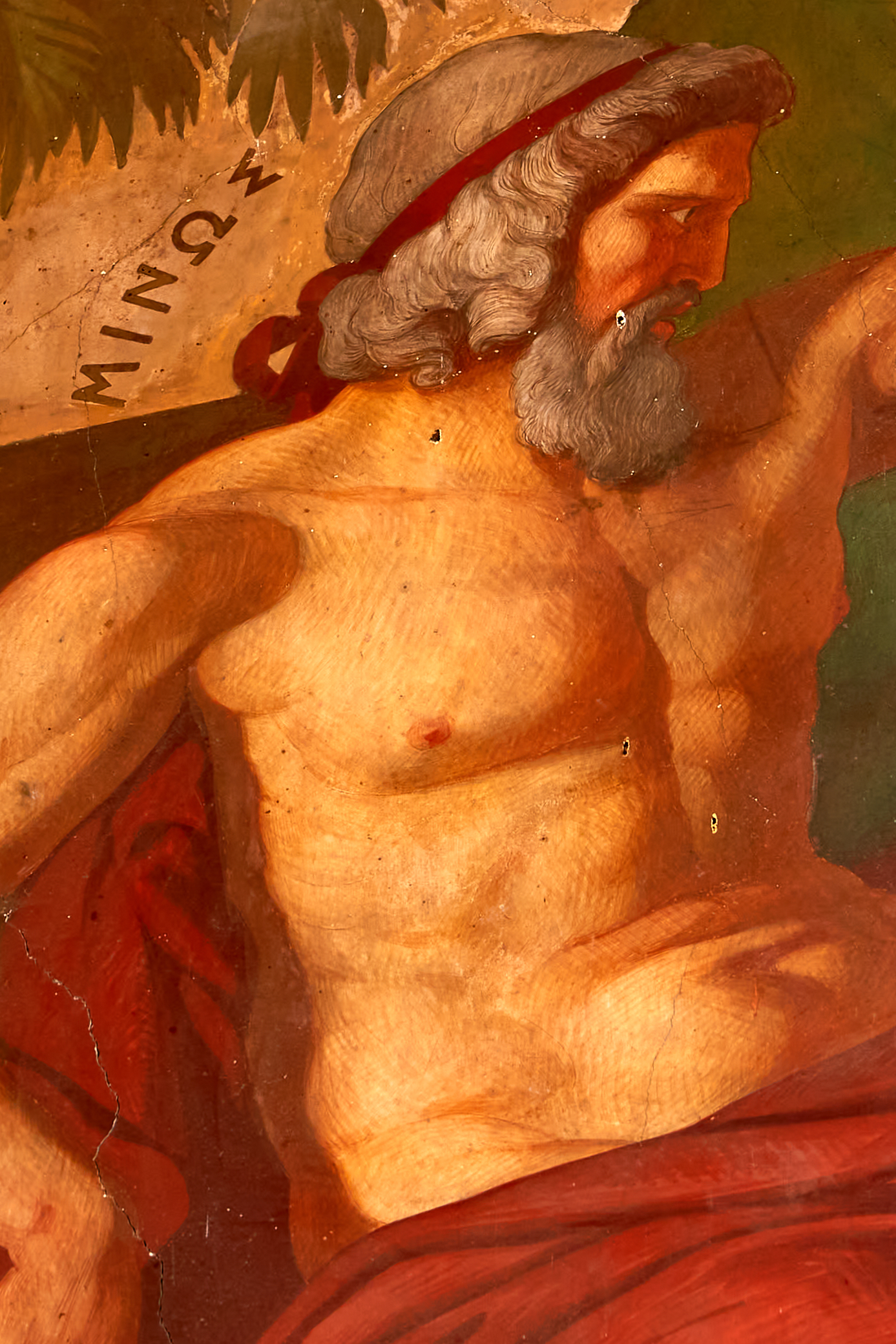
Mural of Minos at the National and Kapodistrain University of Athens

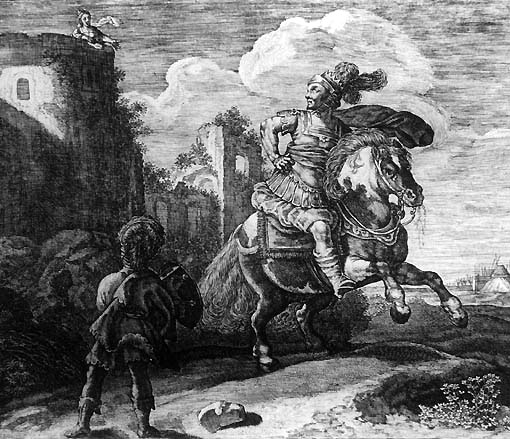
17th-century engraving of Scylla falling in love with Minos

Minos appears in Greek literature as the king of Knossos as early as Homer's Iliad and Odyssey. Thucydides tells us Minos was the most ancient man known to build a navy. He reigned over Crete and the islands of the Aegean Sea three generations before the Trojan War. He lived at Knossos for nine years, where he received instruction from Zeus in the legislation he gave to the island. He was the author of the Cretan constitution and the founder of its naval supremacy.

On the Athenian stage, Minos was one who had strong character, but was also a cruel tyrant. When Asterius died, Minos was boasting to himself that he deserved the rule while shunning the gods. According to Homer, Minos conversed with Zeus every nine years, for educational purposes. Being the only one who received lessons from Zeus made Minos receive great praise. However, he was the heartless exactor of the tribute of Athenian youths to feed to the Minotaur, in revenge for the death of his son Androgeus during a riot (see Theseus). While Minos had stern character and was the law of the land, he was also cruel; this made Minos one who was respected but also greatly feared.

=== Later rationalization ===
To reconcile the contradictory aspects of his character, as well as to explain how Minos governed Crete over a period spanning so many generations, two kings by the name of Minos were assumed by later poets and rationalizing mythologists, such as Diodorus Siculus and Plutarch—"putting aside the mythological element", as he claims—in his life of Theseus.

According to this view, the first King Minos was the son of Zeus and Europa and the brother of Rhadamanthys and Sarpedon. This was the 'good' king Minos, and he was held in such esteem by the Olympian gods that, after he died, he was made one of the three "Judges of the Dead", alongside his brother Rhadamanthys and half-brother Aeacus. The wife of this "Minos I" was said to be Itone (daughter of Lyktos) or Crete (a nymph or daughter of his stepfather Asterion), and he had a single son named Lycastus, his successor as King of Crete.

Lycastus had a son named Minos, after his grandfather, born by Lycastus's wife, Ida, daughter of Corybas. "Minos II"—the "bad" king Minos—is the son of this Lycastus, and was a far more colorful character than his father and grandfather. This is the Minos in the myths of Theseus, Pasiphaë, the Minotaur, Daedalus, Glaucus, and Nisus. Unlike Minos I, Minos II fathered numerous children, including Androgeus, Catreus, Deucalion, Ariadne, Phaedra, and Glaucus—all born to him by his wife, Pasiphaë. Through Deucalion, he was the grandfather of King Idomeneus, who led the Cretans to the Trojan War.

== Rule and laws ==
According to Aristotle, Minos established a caste system in Crete, as well as common meals. Heraclides Lembus says that the constitution of Crete was devised by Minos. Lucian also references this role as a lawgiver in his Anacharsis, having Solon say that Lycurgus was fascinated by the laws of Crete, said to have been established by Minos. Thucydides wrote that Minos was the first known king to establish a navy, and that he used it to fight piracy to secure his revenue.

== Family ==
By his wife, Pasiphaë (or some say Crete), the daughter of the Sun (Helios), and mother of the Minotaur, he fathered Ariadne, Androgeus, Deucalion, Phaedra, Glaucus, Catreus, Acacallis, and Xenodice. By a nymph, Pareia, he had four sons, Eurymedon, Nephalion, Chryses, and Philolaus, whom Heracles killed in revenge for the murder of the latter's two companions. By Dexithea, one of the Telchines, he had a son called Euxanthius. By Androgeneia of Phaistos, he had Asterion, who commanded the Cretan contingent in the war between Dionysus and the Indians. Also given as his children are Euryale, possibly the mother of Orion with Poseidon; Pholegander, eponym of the island Pholegandros; and Idaea, mother of a different Asterion. Minos, along with his brothers, Rhadamanthys and Sarpedon, was raised by King Asterion (or Asterius) of Crete. When Asterion died, his throne was claimed by Minos, who, according to some sources, banished his brothers.

== Mythological Minos ==
Asterion, king of Crete, adopted the three sons of Zeus and Europa: Minos, Sarpedon, and Rhadamanthus. According to the Odyssey (Book XIX l. 203, as interpreted by Plato in Laws 624), Minos consulted with Zeus every nine years. He got his laws straight from Zeus himself. When Minos's son Androgeos won the Panathenaic Games, the king, Aegeus, sent him to Marathon to fight a bull, resulting in the death of Androgeos. Outraged, Minos went to Athens to avenge his son, and on the way, he camped at Megara, where Nisos lived. Learning that Nisos's strength came from his hair, Minos gained the love of Scylla and her aid in cutting off her father's hair so that he could conquer the city. After his triumph, he punished Scylla for her treachery against her father by tying her to a boat and dragging her until she drowned. On arriving in Attica, he asked Zeus to punish the city, and the god struck it with plague and hunger. An oracle told the Athenians to meet any of Minos's demands if they wanted to escape the punishment. Minos then asked Athens to send seven boys and seven girls to Crete every nine years to be sacrificed to the Minotaur (the offspring from the zoophilic encounter of Minos's wife Pasiphaë with the Cretan Bull that the king refused to surrender to Poseidon) which he had placed within a labyrinth he commanded his architect Daedalus to build. The Minotaur was defeated by the hero Theseus with the help of Minos's daughter Ariadne.

=== Glaucus ===
Glaucus was playing with a ball or mouse and suddenly disappeared one day. The Curetes told the Cretans, "A marvelous creature has been born amongst you: whoever finds the true likeness of this creature will also find the child."

Three times a day, the calf changed color from white to red to black. Polyidus of Argos observed the similarity to the ripening of the fruit of the mulberry plant, and Minos sent him to find Glaucus.

Searching for the boy, Polyidus saw an owl driving bees away from a wine cellar in Minos's palace. Inside the wine cellar was a cask of honey, with Glaucus dead inside. Minos demanded Glaucus be brought back to life, though Polyidus objected. Minos ordered Polyidus to be entombed with the body. When a snake appeared nearby, Polyidus killed it immediately. Another snake came for the first, and after seeing its mate dead, the second serpent left and brought back an herb, bringing the first snake back to life. Following this example, Polyidus used the same herb to resurrect Glaucus.

Minos refused to let Polyidus leave Crete until he taught Glaucus the art of divination. Polyidus did so, but then, at the last moment before leaving, he asked Glaucus to spit in his mouth. Glaucus did so and forgot everything he had been taught.

=== Poseidon, Daedalus and Pasiphaë ===
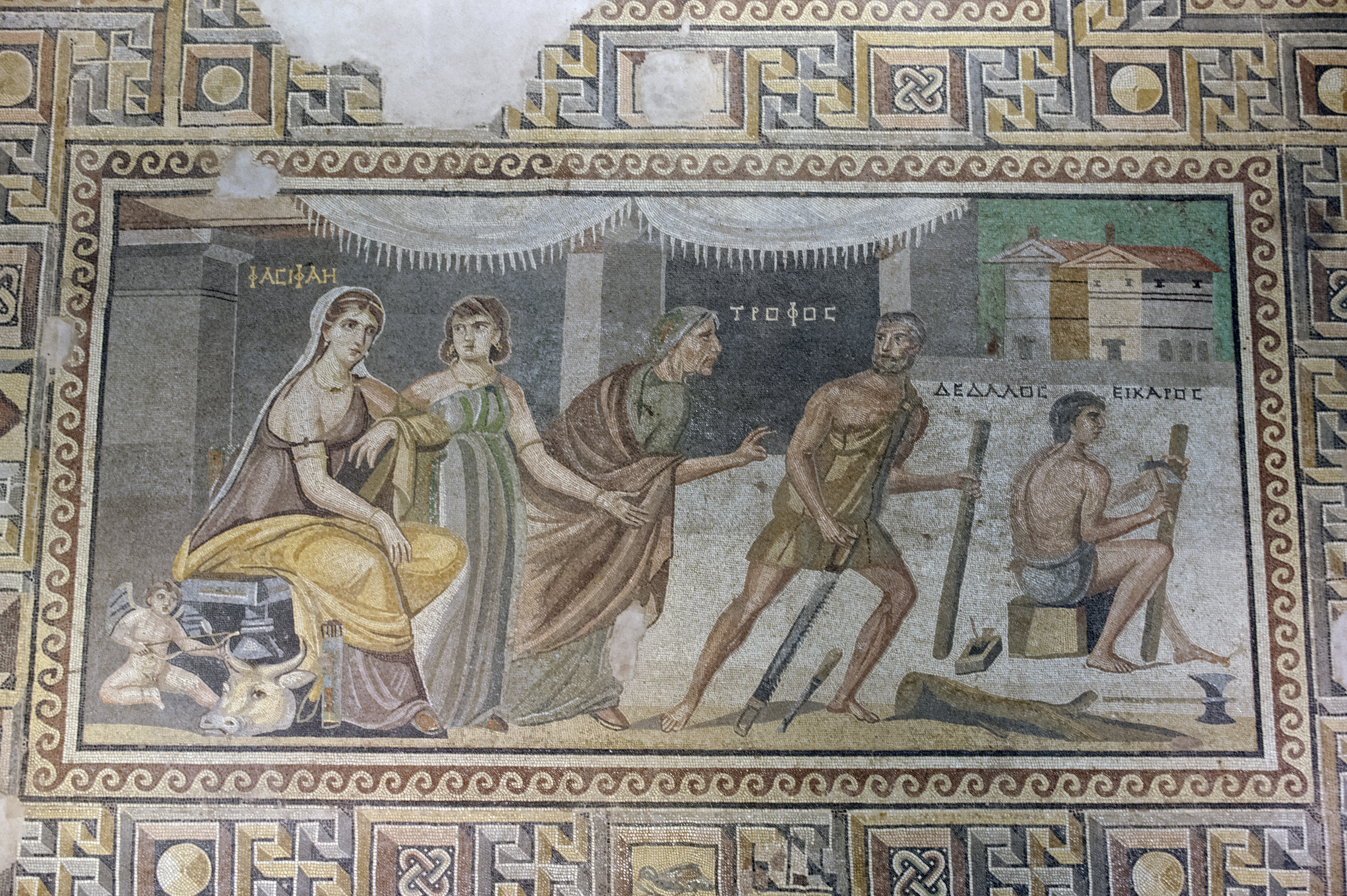
A Roman mosaic from Zeugma, Commagene (now in the Zeugma Mosaic Museum) depicting Daedalus, his son Icarus, Queen Pasiphaë, and two of her female attendants

Minos justified his accession as king and prayed to Poseidon for a sign. Poseidon sent a giant white bull out of the sea. Minos was committed to sacrificing the bull to Poseidon but then decided to substitute a different bull. Poseidon cursed Pasiphaë, Minos's wife, in rage, with a mad passion for the bull. Daedalus built her a wooden cow, which she hid inside. The bull mated with the wooden cow, and Pasiphaë was impregnated by the bull, giving birth to a horrible monster, again named Asterius, the Minotaur, half-man half bull. Daedalus then built a complicated "chamber that with its tangled windings perplexed the outward way" called the Labyrinth, and Minos put the Minotaur in it. To make sure no one would ever know the secret of who the Minotaur was and how to get out of the Labyrinth (Daedalus knew both of these things), Minos imprisoned Daedalus and his son, Icarus, along with the monster. Daedalus and Icarus flew away on wings Daedalus invented, but Icarus's wings melted because he flew too close to the sun. Icarus fell into the sea and drowned.

=== Theseus ===
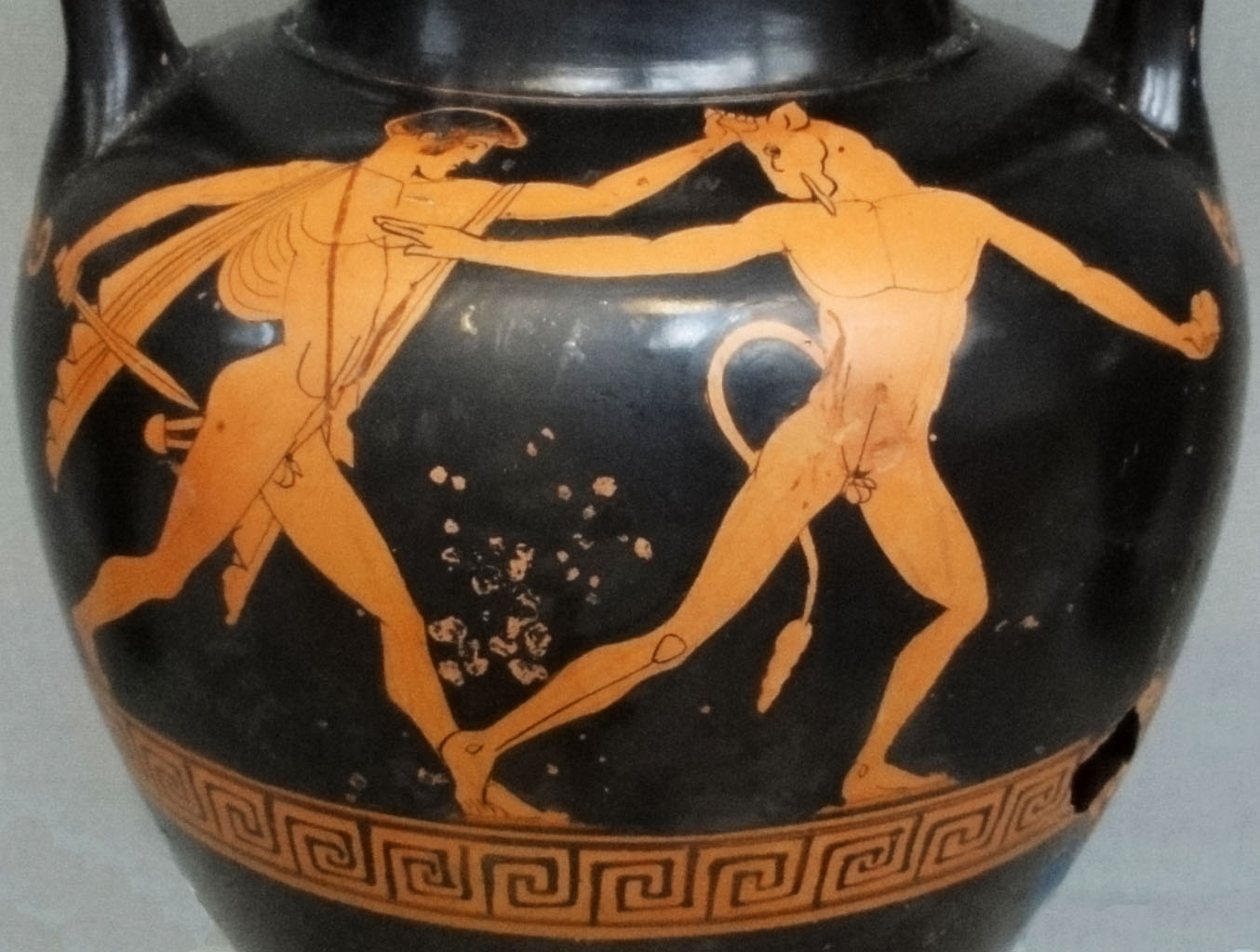
Amphora showing Theseus slaying the Minotaur, 460 BC. Ref:1837,0609.57 .

Minos's son Androgeus won every game in a contest hosted by Aegeas of Athens. Alternatively, the other contestants were jealous of Androgeus and killed him. Minos was angry and declared war on Athens. He offered the Athenians peace if they sent Minos seven young men and seven virgin maidens to feed the Minotaur yearly (which corresponded directly to the Minoans' meticulous records of lunar alignments – a full moon falls on the equinoxes once every eight years). This continued until Theseus killed the Minotaur with the help of Ariadne, Minos's lovestruck daughter.

=== Nisus ===
Minos was also part of the King Nisus story. Nisus was King of Megara and was invincible as long as a lock of crimson hair still existed, hidden in his white hair. Minos attacked Megara, but Nisus knew he could not be beaten because he still had his lock of crimson hair. His daughter, Scylla, fell in love with Minos and proved it by cutting the crimson hair off her father's head. Nisus died, and Megara fell to Crete. Minos spurned Scylla for disobeying her father. She was changed into a shearer bird, relentlessly pursued by her father, who was a falcon.

=== Death ===
Minos searched for Daedalus by traveling from city to city, asking a riddle; he presented a spiral seashell and asked for it to be strung all the way through. When he reached Camicus, Sicily, King Cocalus, knowing Daedalus would be able to solve the riddle, fetched the old man. He tied the string to an ant, which walked through the seashell, stringing it all the way through. Minos then knew Daedalus was in the court of King Cocalus and demanded he be handed over. Cocalus managed to convince him to take a bath first; then Cocalus's daughters and Daedalus, with Minos trapped in the tub, scalded him to death with boiling water.

According to Diodorus Siculus, after his death, Minos's body was given to the Cretans. After this, he was buried with a magnificent ceremony, and a two-storey tomb was built for him; the underground segment contained his bones, while the segment on the top was a shrine for Aphrodite.

After his death, Minos became a judge of the dead in Hades together with his half-brother Aeacus and his full-brother Rhadamanthus. Rhadamanthus judged the souls of Asians, Aeacus judged Europeans, and Minos had the deciding vote.

== Minos in art ==
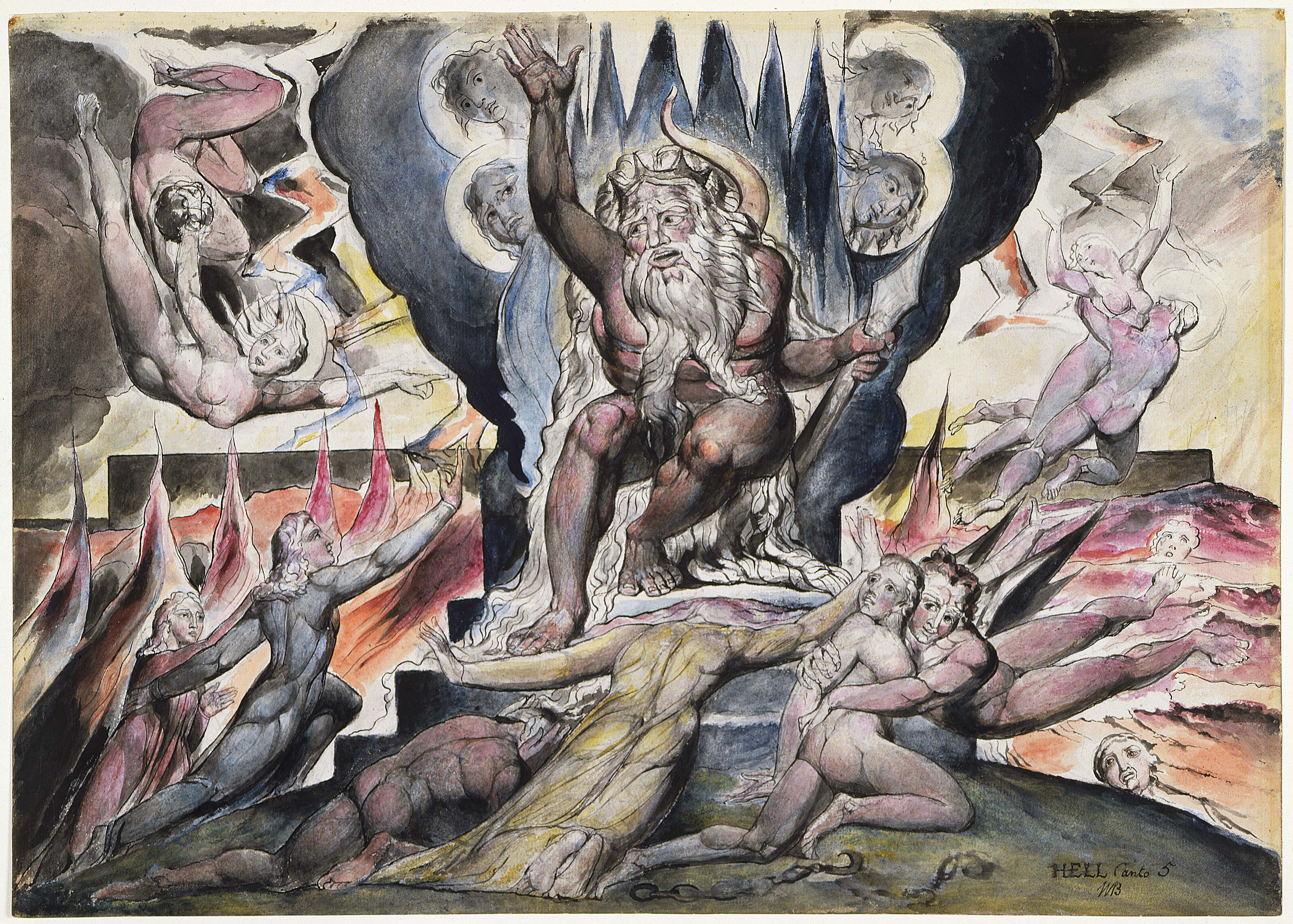
Minos was depicted by Romantic British artist William Blake as part of his illustrations of Dante's Divine Comedy. The original object for this image is held by the National Gallery of Victoria.

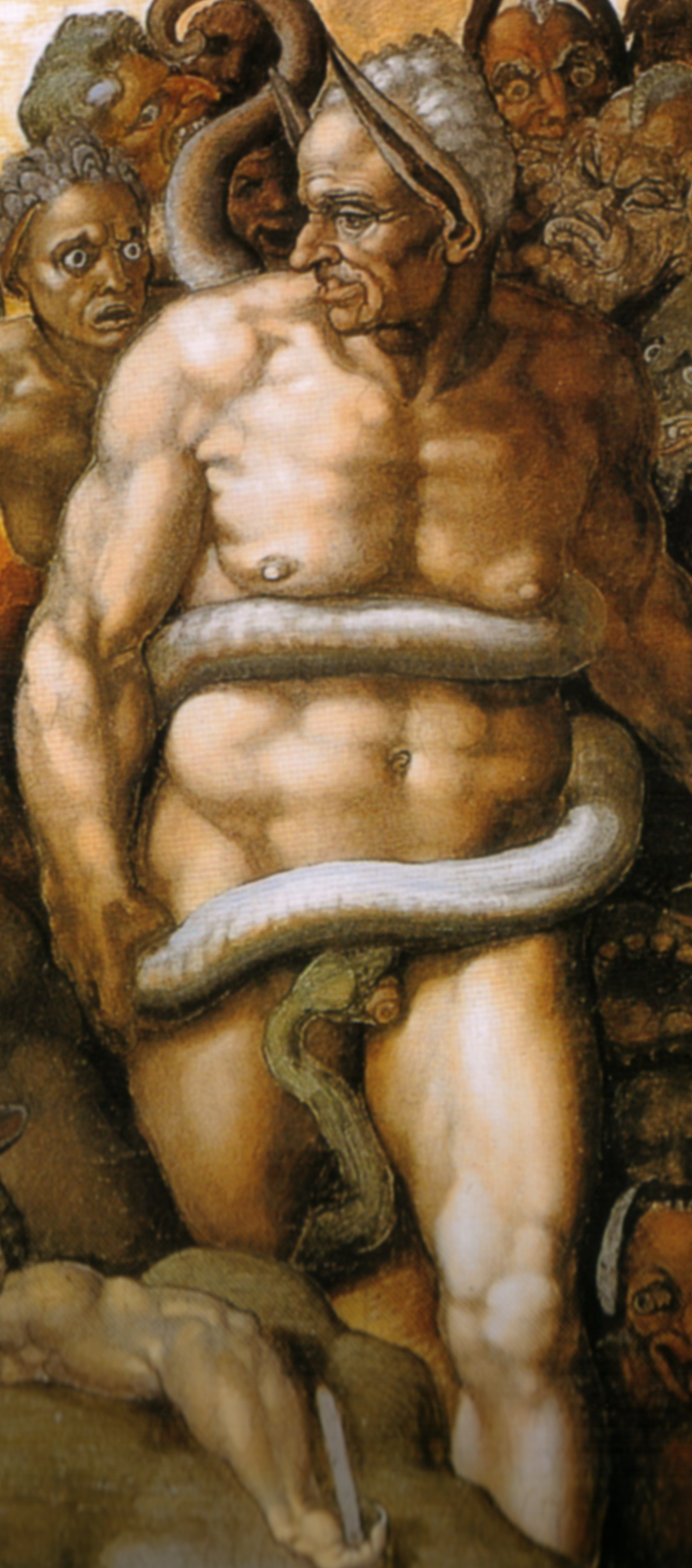
Judge Minos in The Last Judgement.

On Cretan coins, Minos is represented as bearded, wearing a diadem, curly-haired, haughty, and dignified, like the traditional portraits of his reputed father, Zeus. He frequently occurs on painted vases and sarcophagus bas-reliefs, with Aeacus and Rhadamanthus as underworld judges and in connection with the Minotaur and Theseus.

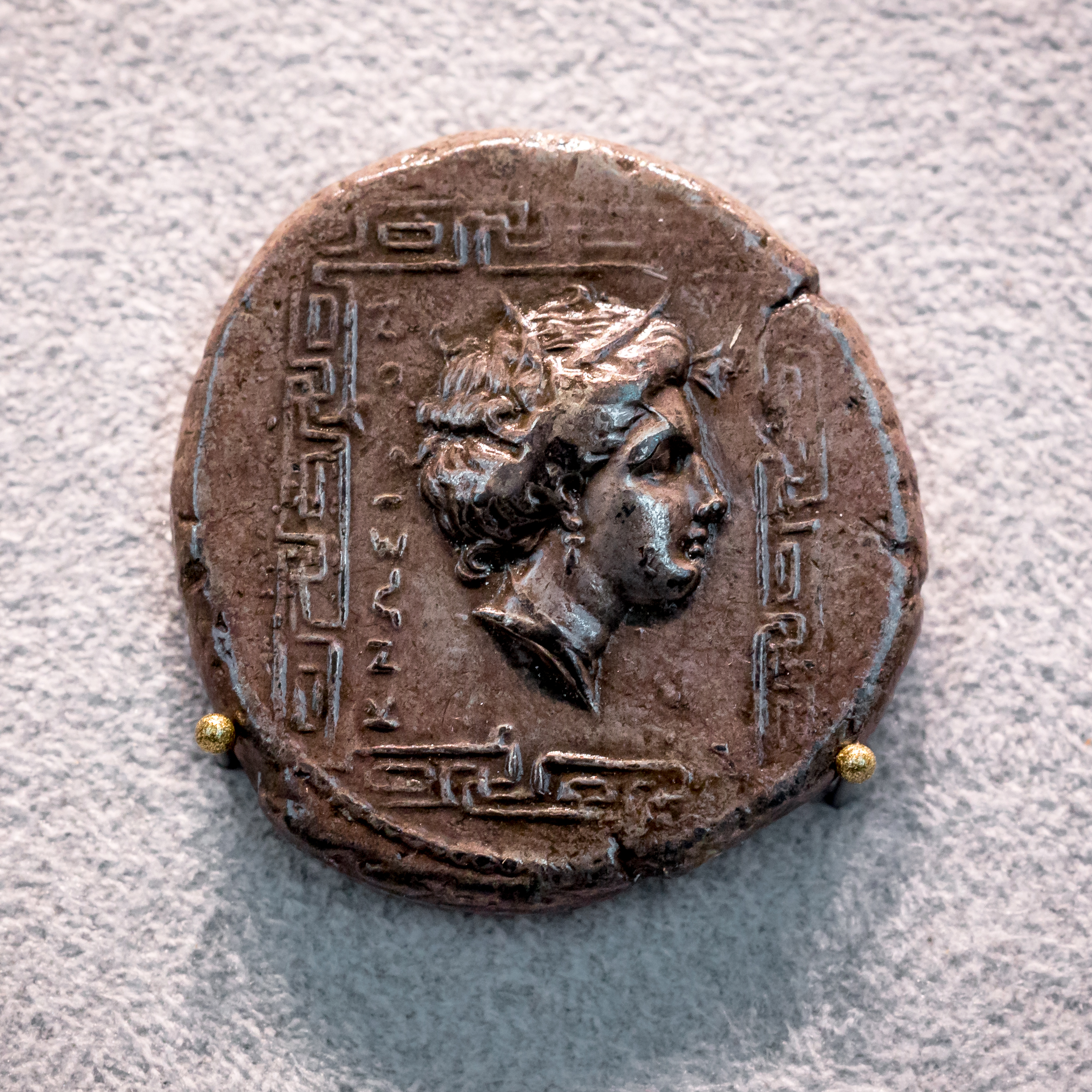
Knosos - 400-350 BC - silver stater - head of Ariadne - Minos

In Michelangelo's famous fresco, The Last Judgment (located in the Sistine Chapel), Minos appears as a judge of the underworld, surrounded by a crowd of devils. With his tail coiled around him and two donkey ears (symbol of stupidity), Minos judges the damned as they are brought down to hell (see Inferno, Second Circle).

=== In poetry ===
In the Aeneid of Virgil, Minos was the judge of those who had been given the death penalty on a false charge - Minos sits with a huge urn and decides whether a soul should go to Elysium or Tartarus with the help of a silent jury. Radamanthus, his brother, is a judge at Tartarus who decides upon suitable punishments for sinners there.

In Dante Alighieri's Divine Comedy story Inferno, Minos is depicted as having a snake-like tail. He sits at the entrance to the second circle in the Inferno, which is the beginning of Hell proper. There, he judges the sins of each soul and assigns it to its appropriate punishment by indicating the circle to which it must descend. He does this by circling his tail around his body the appropriate number of times. He can also speak to clarify the soul's location within the circle indicated by the wrapping of his tail.

== Astronomy ==
Minor planet 6239 Minos is named after Minos. Its orbit being relatively close to Earth's, it is deemed as a potentially hazardous asteroid.

== See also ==
- Minos, a dialogue attributed to Plato
- Menes a pharaoh of the Early Dynastic Period of ancient Egypt
- Chinvat Bridge, the bridge of the dead in Persian cosmology
- Sraosha, Mithra and Rashnu, guardians and judges of souls in Zoroastrian tradition
