= Phlias =

Greek mythical character, father of Dameon

Phlias (Ancient Greek: Φλίας) or Phlius /ˈflaɪəs/ or Phliasus /ˈflaɪəsəs/ was the son of Dionysus and Ariadne, and husband of Chthonophyle in Greek mythology. A native of Araithyrea in Argolis, he is mentioned as one of the Argonauts.

== Family ==
Pausanias cites a version in which Phlias is given as son of Ceisus, but himself maintains that Phlias was the son of Dionysus by Araethyrea (daughter of Aras), whereas Chthonophyle was his wife and mother of his son Androdamas. Hyginus calls him Phliasus, and a son of Dionysus and Ariadne. In the Argonautica Orphica, it is simply stated that his mother was a nymph, without mention of her name. The town of Phlius (formerly called Araithyrea) was believed to have derived its name from him.
