= Rectimarginalis =

Scientific classification
- Domain: Eukaryota
- Kingdom: Animalia
- Phylum: Arthropoda
- Class: Insecta
- Order: Orthoptera
- Suborder: Ensifera
- Family: Tettigoniidae
- Subfamily: Phaneropterinae
- Tribe: Holochlorini
- Genus: Rectimarginalis; Liu & Kang, 2007

Genus of cricket-like animals

External image
- Images at iNaturalist

Rectimarginalis is a genus of Asian bush crickets of the tribe Holochlorini within the subfamily Phaneropterinae. Species are found in India, Indo-China, China, and Malesia:

== Species ==
The Orthoptera Species File lists:

- Rectimarginalis ensis (Haan, 1842)
- Rectimarginalis fuscospinosa (Brunner von Wattenwyl, 1891) - type species
  (as Holochlora fusco-spinosa Brunner von Wattenwyl)
- Rectimarginalis profunda Liu & Kang, 2007
- Rectimarginalis traba (Ingrisch & Shishodia, 1998)
