= Ariadneia =

Ancient Greek festival in honor of Ariadne

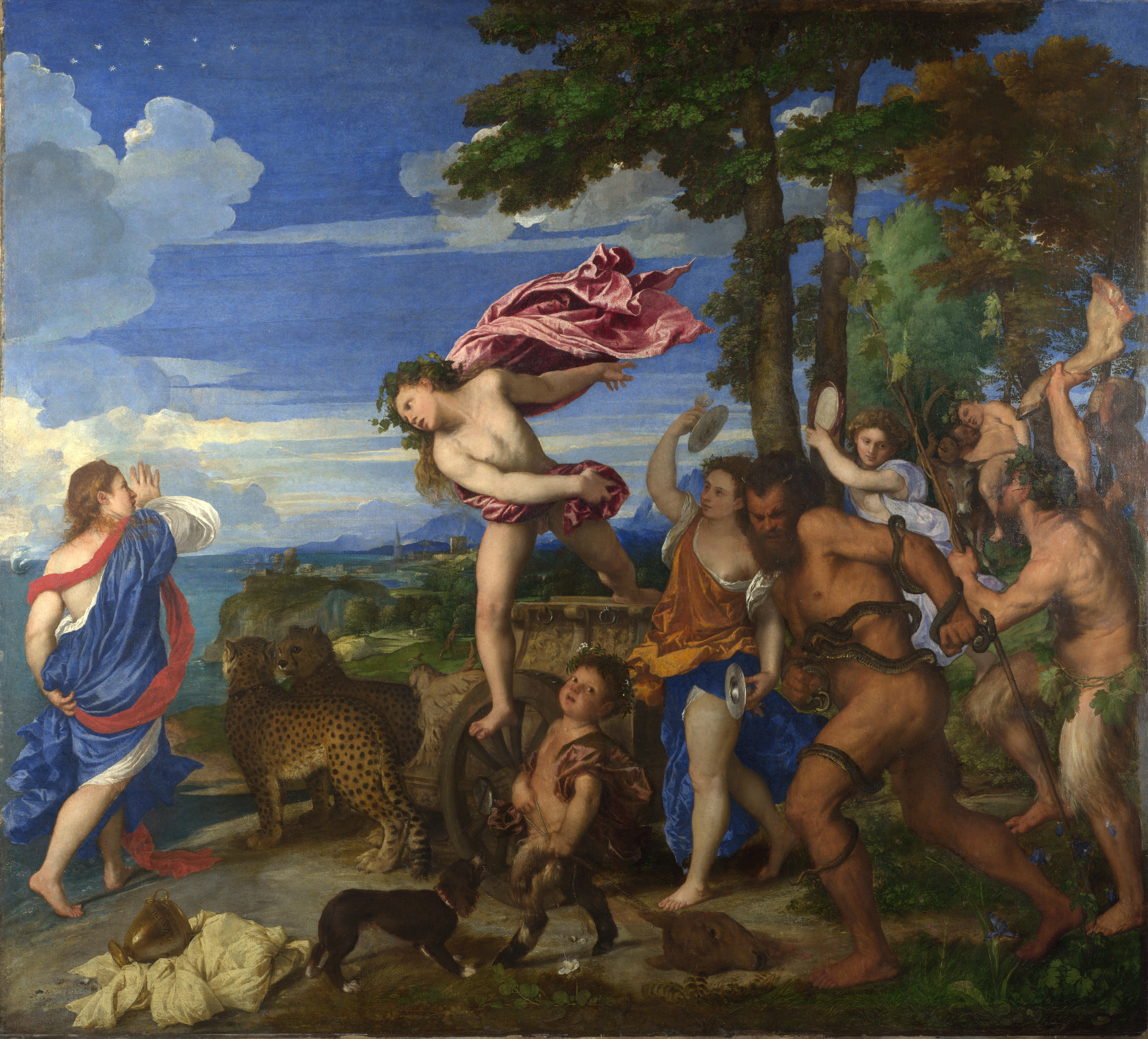
Bacchus and Ariadne on Naxos, painting by Titian.

The Ariadneia (Ancient Greek: Αριάδνεια) was an ancient festival primarily celebrated on Naxos, as well as on Delos and Cyprus, in honor of Ariadne. Specifically on Naxos, two distinct festivals with the same name were held. One was dedicated to the abandoned Ariadne by Theseus, and the other honored Ariadne as the wife of the god Dionysus and mother of Staphylus and Oenopion, who, according to local tradition, were considered different figures. In Naxos, one tradition suggests that Ariadne died a natural death on the island, and she was honored with sacrifices accompanied by rejoicing and merriment.

In Cyprus, another festival of the same name was celebrated in honor of Ariadne, said to have been instituted by Theseus in commemoration of her death in the month of Gorpiaeos (late August to early September). The Amathusians even called the grove where Ariadne's grave was located the grove of Aphrodite-Ariadne. This tradition connects Ariadne with a local cult blending her figure with that of the goddess Aphrodite.

In other regions, such as Crete, the festival was dedicated to Ariadne as the daughter of Minos. Additionally, the Ariadneia was also celebrated in ancient Athens, where, during the Classical period, it had been incorporated into the festivals held in honor of Dionysus, known as the Oschophoria.

== Bibliography ==
- William Smith; William Wayte; G. E. Marindin, eds. (1890). "ARIADNEIA". A Dictionary of Greek and Roman Antiquities.
- Plutarch. Bernadotte Perrin (ed.). Theseus.
- C. F. Hermann. "§ 65, n. 12". Gottesdienstliche Alterthümer (in German).
