= Enyeus =

In Greek mythology, the name Enyeus (Ancient Greek: Ἐνυεύς) may refer to:

- Enyeus, a king of the island Skyros. According to scholia on the Iliad, he was a son of Dionysus and Ariadne. In the Iliad itself, his kingdom is said to have been invaded by Achilles. Diodorus Siculus states that he was king of Cyrnus (modern Corsica), which was assigned to him by Rhadamanthys under whom he served as a general.
- Enyeus, a warrior who fought and fell in the war of the Seven against Thebes.
- Enyeus, a defender of Troy killed by Ajax the Great.
- Enyeus, father of the Delphian prophetess Homoloia.
