= Ariadne =

Daughter of Minos in Greek mythology

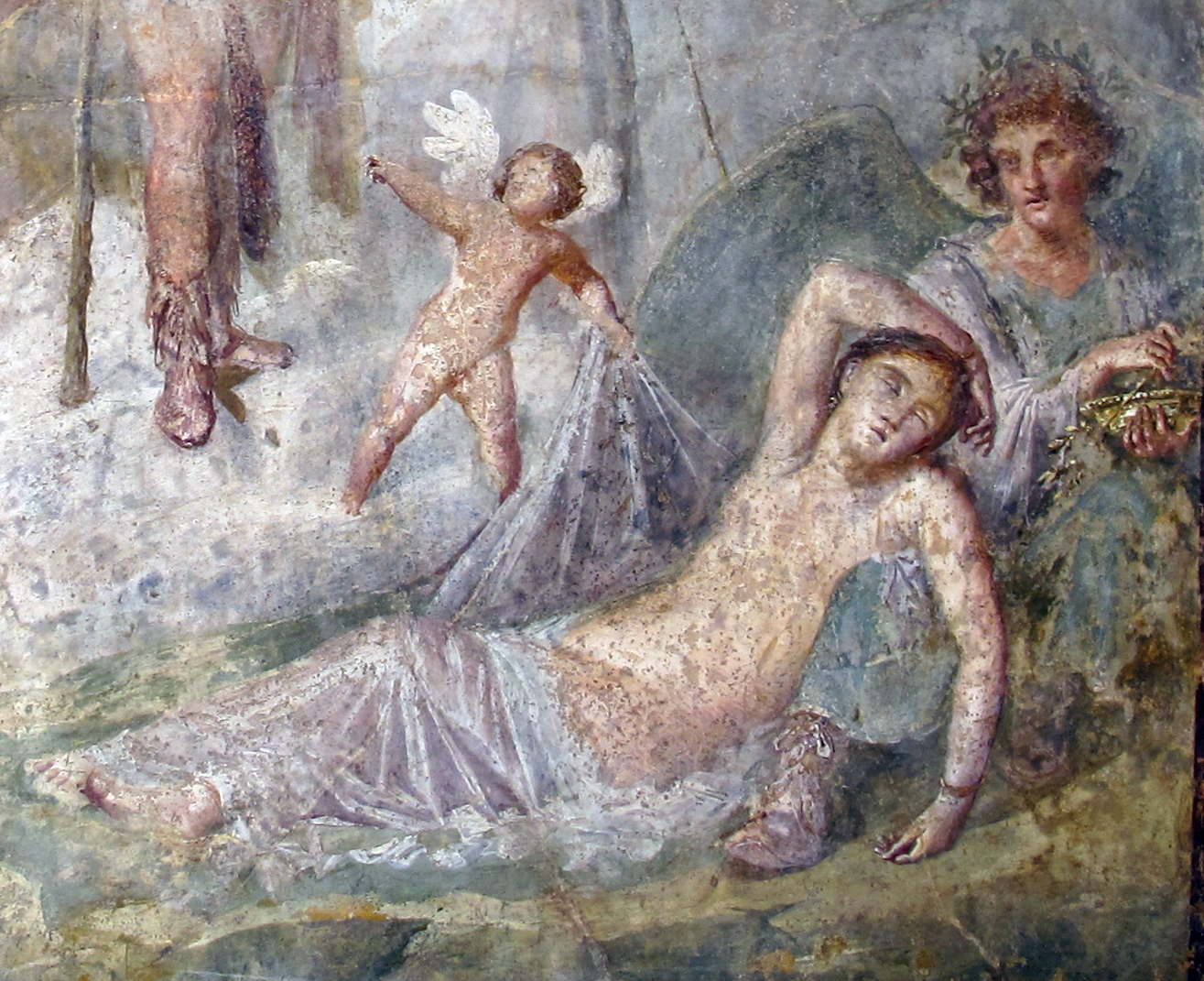
- Ariadne asleep at Hypnos's side. Detail of ancient fresco in Pompeii
- Abode: Crete, later Mount Olympus
- Symbol: String / Thread, Serpent, Bull

Genealogy
- Parents: Minos and Pasiphaë (or Crete, daughter of Asterius)
- Siblings: Acacallis, Phaedra, Catreus, Deucalion, Glaucus, Androgeus, Xenodice; the Minotaur
- Consort: Dionysus, Theseus
- Children: Staphylus, Oenopion, Thoas, Peparethus, Phanus, Eurymedon, Phliasus, Ceramus, Maron, Evanthes, Latramys, Tauropolis, Enyeus and Eunous

Equivalents
- Roman: Libera

In Greek mythology, Ariadne (/ˌæriˈædni/; Ancient Greek: Ἀριάδνη, romanized: Ariádnē) was a Cretan princess as the daughter of King Minos. There are multiple variations of Ariadne's myth, but she is best known for helping Theseus escape from the Minotaur and being abandoned by him on the island of Naxos. There, Dionysus saw Ariadne sleeping, fell in love with her, and later married her. Many versions of the myth recount Dionysus throwing Ariadne's jeweled crown into the sky to create a constellation, Corona Borealis.

There were festivals held in Cyprus and Naxos in Ariadne's honor.

== Etymology ==
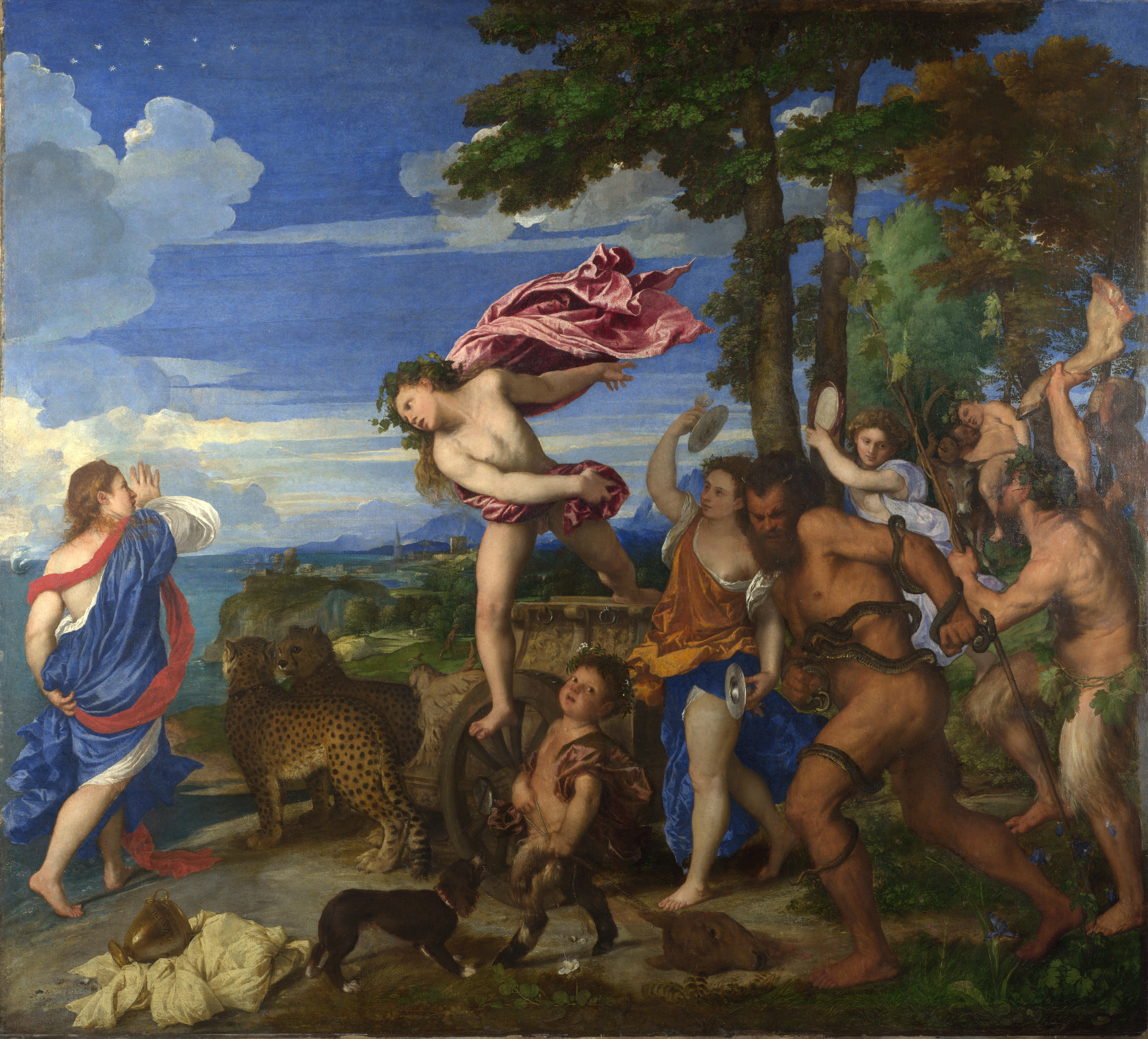
Bacchus and Ariadne by Titian: Dionysus discovers Ariadne on the shore of Naxos. The painting also depicts the constellation named after Ariadne.

Greek lexicographers in the Hellenistic period claimed that Ariadne is derived from the ancient Cretan dialectical elements ari (ἀρι-) "most" (which is an intensive prefix) and adnós (ἀδνός) "holy". Conversely, Stylianos Alexiou has argued that despite the belief being that Ariadne's name is of Indo-European origin, it is actually pre-Greek.

Linguist Robert S. P. Beekes has also supported Ariadne having a pre-Greek origin; specifically being Minoan from Crete because her name includes the sequence dn (δν), rare in Indo-European languages and an indication that it is a Minoan loanword.

== Family ==
Ariadne's father was Minos, king of Crete and son of Zeus and Europa. Her mother was most commonly named as Pasiphaë, queen of Crete and the daughter of Helios and Perse. Some authors alternately named her mother as Crete, the daughter of Asterius and Europa.

Ariadne was the sister of Acacallis, Androgeus, Deucalion, Phaedra, Glaucus, Xenodice, and Catreus. Through her mother, Pasiphaë, she was also the half-sister of the Minotaur (who was known in Crete as Asterion).

Ariadne later married Dionysus and became the mother of Oenopion, the personification of wine, Staphylus, who was associated with grapes, as well as Thoas, Peparethus, Eurymedon, Phliasus, Ceramus, Maron, Euanthes, Latramys, and Tauropolis. (Note: Euanthes, Latramys, and Tauropolis are only mentioned in scholia on Apollonius Rhodius Enyeus, scholia on Homer and Eunous.)

Ariadne's family
Relation	Names	Sources													
Relation	Names	Homer		Hesiod	Apollon.		Diod.	Ovid		Apollod.	Plutarch	Hyginus	Pausa	Quin.	Theophilus
Relation	Names	Ody.	Sch. Ili.	Ehoiai	Arg.	Sch.	Diod.	Her.	Met.	Apollod.	Theseus	Fabulae	Pausa	Quin.	Autolycus
Parentage	Minos	✓		✓			✓		✓		✓				
Parentage	Minos & Pasiphae				✓			✓				✓			
Consort	Dionysus		✓	✓	✓	✓	✓			✓	✓ or			✓	✓
Consort	Theseus										✓				
Children	Enyeus		✓												
Children	Thoas			✓	✓	✓		✓		✓				✓	✓
Children	Oenopion					✓	✓			✓	✓				
Children	Staphylus					✓				✓	✓				✓
Children	Latromis					✓									
Children	Euanthes					✓									
Children	Tauropolis					✓									
Children	Peparethus									✓					
Children	Phliasus											✓			
Children	Eurymedon											✓			
Children	Ceramus												✓		
Children	Maron														✓
Children	Eunous														✓

== Mythology ==
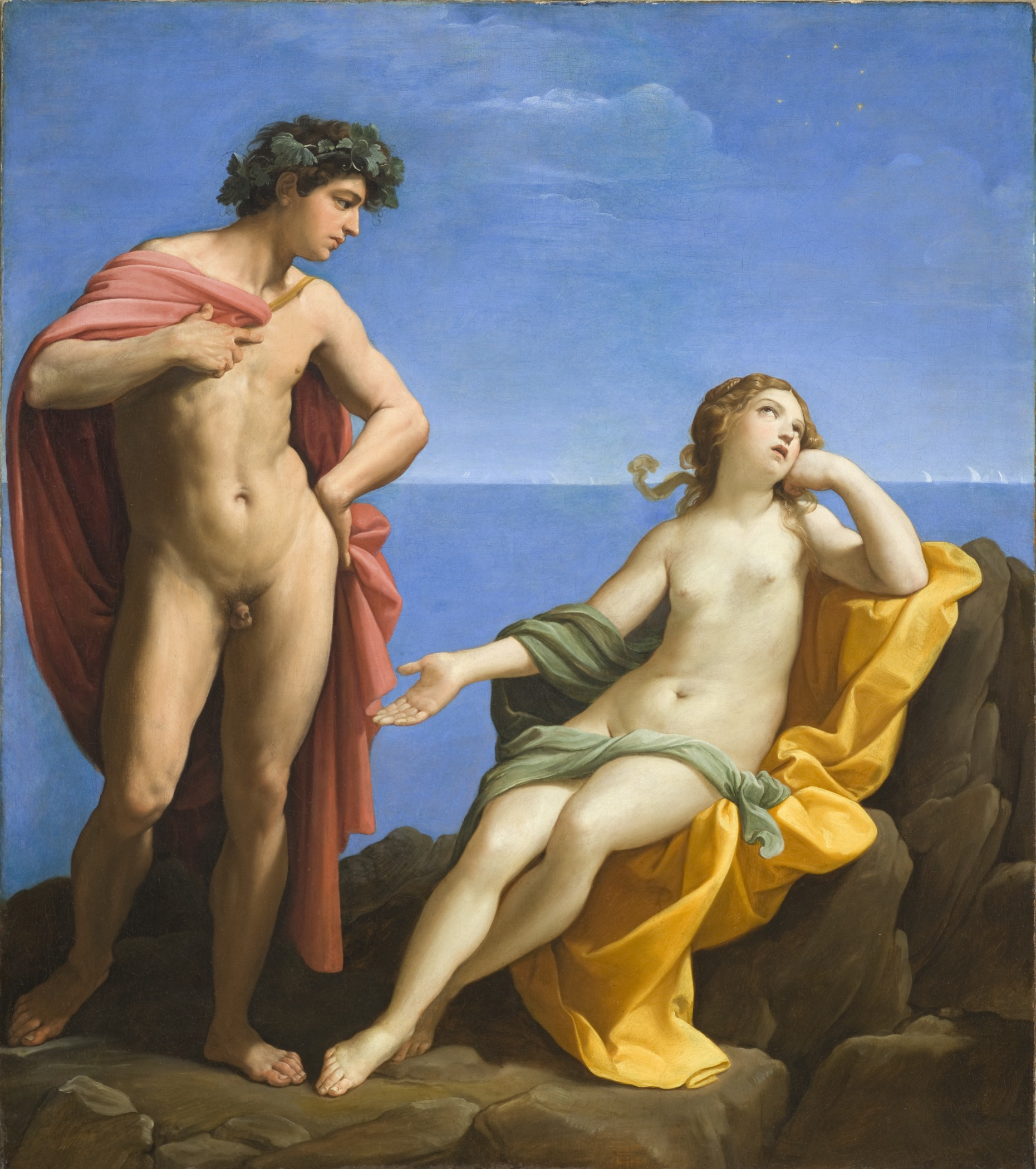
Bacchus and Ariadne, Guido Reni, c. 1620

Minos put Ariadne in charge of the labyrinth where sacrifices were made as part of reparations either to Poseidon or Athena, depending on the version of the myth; later, she helped Theseus conquer the Minotaur and save the children from sacrifice. In other narrations she was the bride of Dionysus; her status as mortal or divine varying in those accounts.

=== Minos and Theseus ===
Because ancient Greek myths were orally transmitted, like other myths, that of Ariadne has many variations. According to an Athenian version, Minos attacked Athens after his son, Androgeus, was killed there. The Athenians asked for terms and were required to sacrifice 7 young men and 7 maidens to the Minotaur every 1, 7 or 9 years (depending on the source). One year, the sacrificial party included Theseus, the son of King Aegeus, who volunteered in order to kill the Minotaur. At first sight, Ariadne fell in love with him and provided him a sword and ball of thread (ο Μίτος της Αριάδνης, "Ariadne's string") so that he could retrace his way out of the labyrinth of the Minotaur.

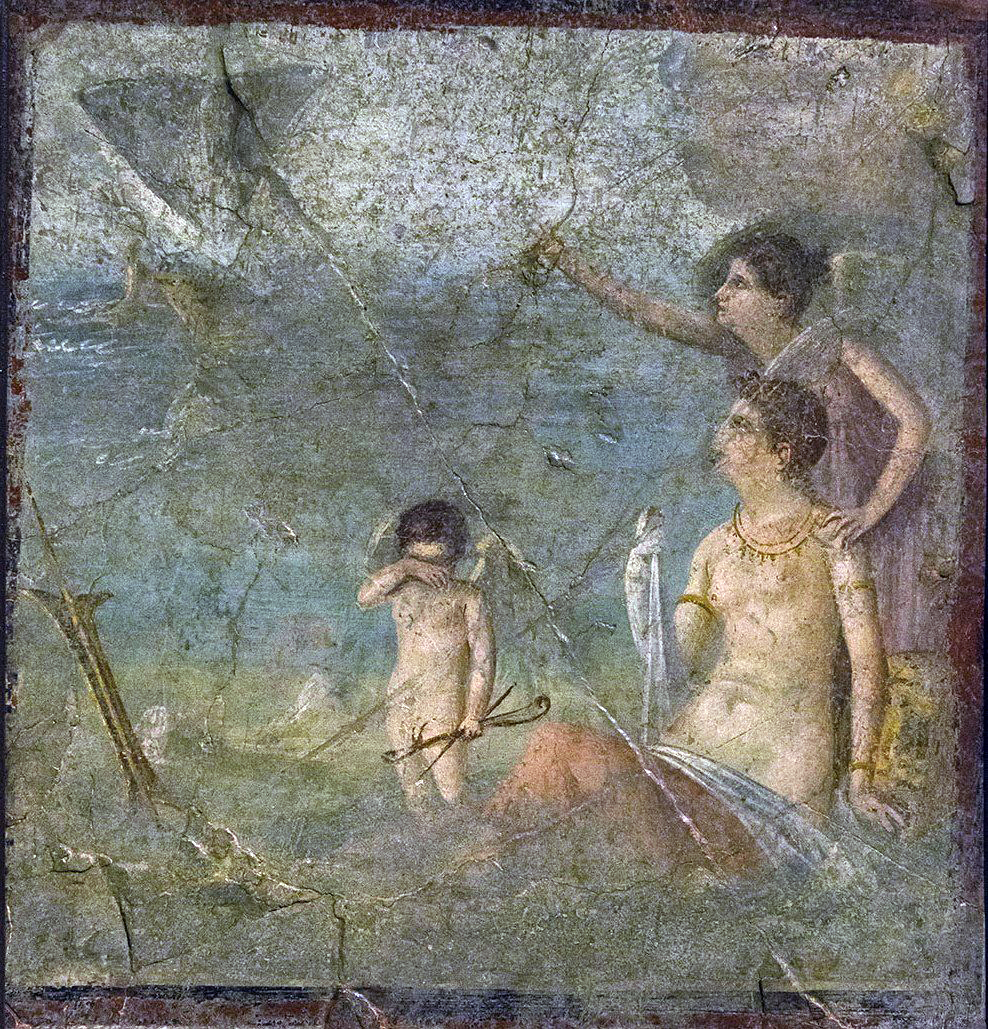
The abandoned Ariadne, ancient fresco from Pompeii, National Archaeological Museum, Naples

Ariadne betrayed her father and her country for her lover Theseus. She eloped with Theseus after he killed the Minotaur, yet according to Homer in the Odyssey "he had no joy of her, for ere that, Artemis slew her in seagirt Dia because of the witness of Dionysus". The phrase "seagirt Dia" refers to the uninhabited island of Dia, which lies off the northern coast of the Greek island of Crete in the Mediterranean Sea. Dia may have referred to the island of Naxos.

Most accounts claim that Theseus abandoned Ariadne on Naxos, and in some versions Perseus mortally wounds her. According to some, Dionysus claimed Ariadne as wife, therefore causing Theseus to abandon her. Homer does not elaborate on the nature of Dionysus's accusation, yet the Oxford Classical Dictionary speculated that she was already married to him when she eloped with Theseus. According to Plutarch, Paion the Amathusian recounted Theseus accidentally abandoned Ariadne only to come back when it was too late.

=== Naxos ===
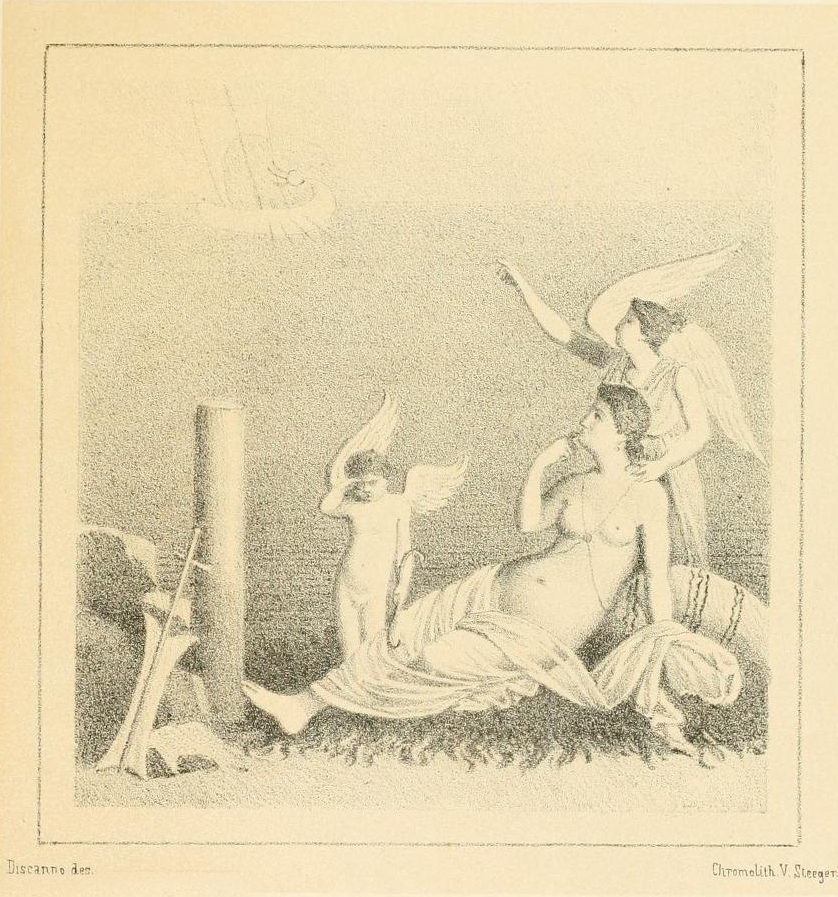
A Greek Epigrams Pompeii Plate by Geremia Discanno depicting Ariadne abandoned on the island Naxos

In Hesiod's work, among others, Dionysus discovered and wedded her on Naxos. In a number of versions of the myth, Dionysus appeared to Theseus as they sailed from Crete, saying that he had chosen Ariadne as his wife and demanding that Theseus leave her on Naxos for him. Vase painters often depicted Athena or Hermes leading Theseus from the sleeping Ariadne to his ship.

Ariadne bore Dionysus famous children, including Oenopion, Staphylus, and Thoas. Dionysus set her wedding diadem in the heavens as the constellation Corona Borealis. Ariadne was faithful to Dionysus. In one version of her myth, Perseus killed her at Argos by turning her to stone with the head of Medusa during Perseus's war with Dionysus. The Odyssey relates that Theseus took Ariadne away from Crete only for Artemis to kill her in Dia (usually identified with Naxos) on Dionysus's witness. An ancient scholiast wrote that Ariadne and Theseus had sex on a sacred grove, and an angry Dionysus revealed that to Artemis, who proceeded to punish Ariadne with death.

According to Plutarch, one version of the myth tells that Ariadne hanged herself after being abandoned by Theseus. Dionysus then went to Hades, and brought her and his mother Semele to Mount Olympus, where they were deified.

Some scholars have posited, because of Ariadne's associations with thread-spinning and winding, that she was a weaving goddess, like Arachne, and support this theory with the mytheme of the Hanged Nymph (see weaving in mythology).

== As a goddess ==
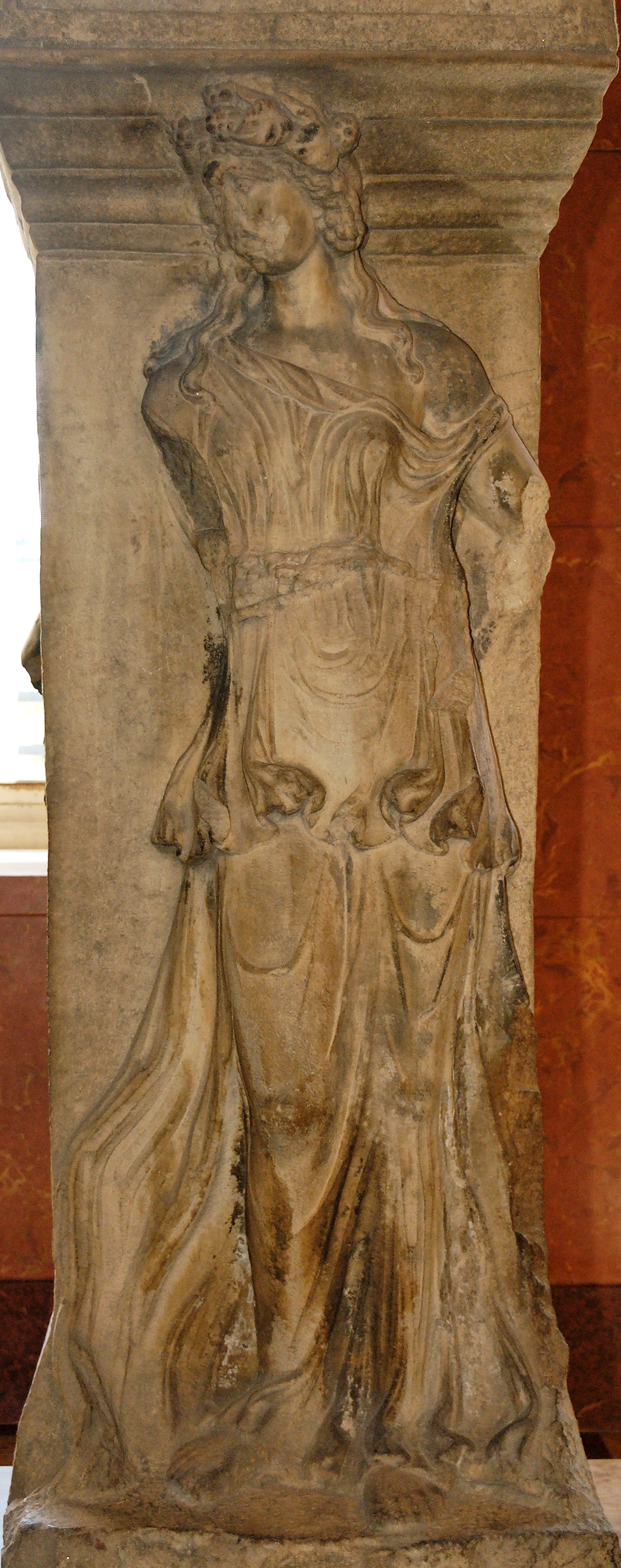
Ariadne of Las Incantadas from the agora of Thessalonica, 2nd century, Louvre

Karl Kerenyi theorized that Ariadne, whose name they thought derived from Hesychius's enumeration of "Άδνον", a Cretan-Greek form of "arihagne" ("utterly pure"), was a Great Goddess of Crete, "the first divine personage of Greek mythology to be immediately recognized in Crete", once archaeological investigation began. Kerenyi observed that her name was merely an epithet and claimed that she was originally the "Mistress of the Labyrinth", both a winding dancing ground and, in the Greek opinion, a prison with the dreaded Minotaur in its centre. Kerenyi explained that a Linear B inscription from Knossos "to all the gods, honey ... [,] to the mistress of the labyrinth honey" in equal amounts, implied to him that the Mistress of the Labyrinth was a Great Goddess in her own right. Professor Barry Powell suggested that she was the Snake Goddess of Minoan Crete.

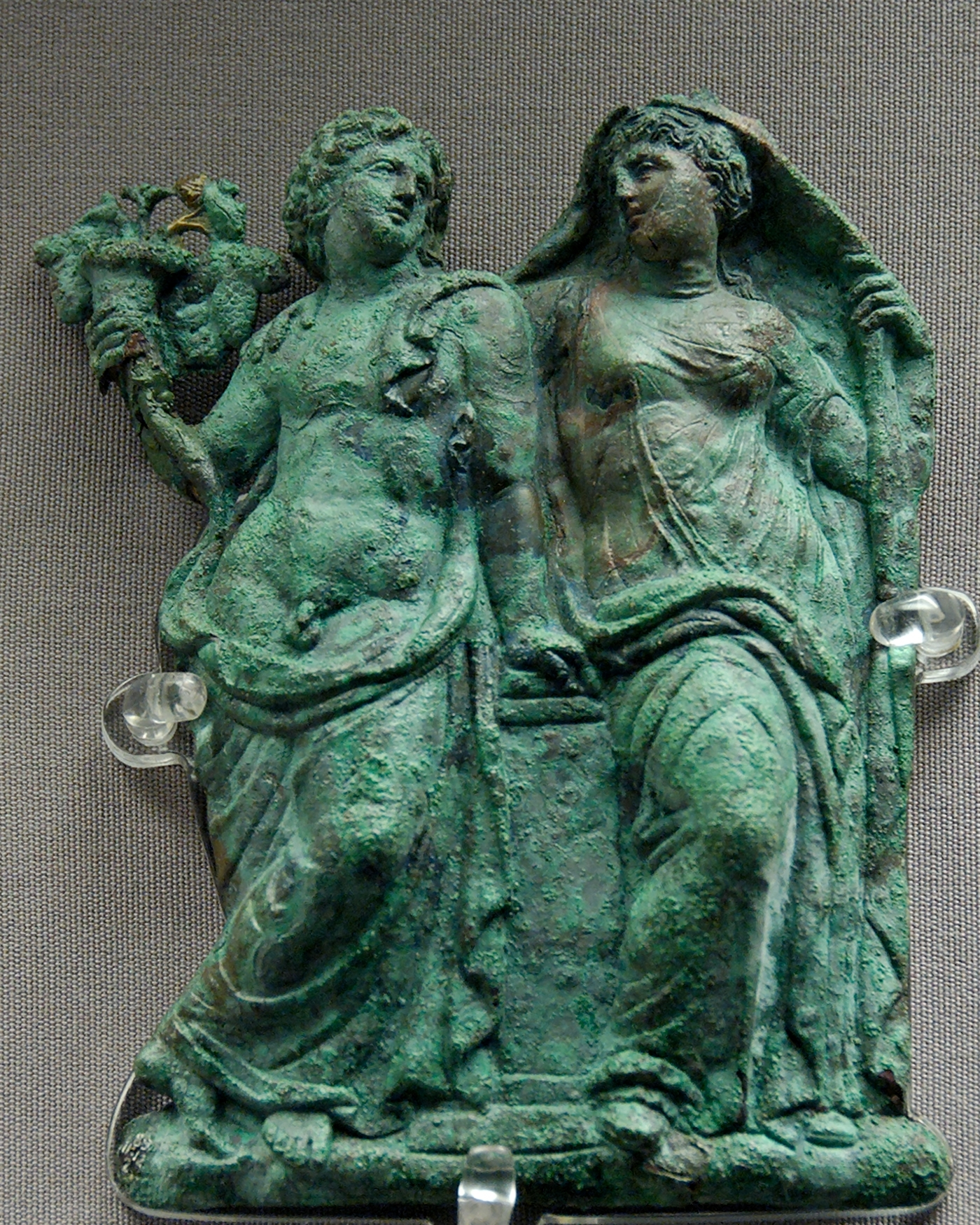
Ariadne as the consort of Dionysus: bronze appliqué from Chalki, Rhodes, late fourth century BCE, in the British Museum.

Plutarch, in his Life of Theseus, which treats him as a historical person, reported that in contemporary Naxos was an earthly Ariadne, who was distinct from a divine one:

Some of the Naxians also have a story of their own, that there were two Minoses and two Ariadnes, one of whom, they say, was married to Dionysos in Naxos and bore him Staphylos and his brother, and the other, of a later time, having been carried off by Theseus and then abandoned by him, came to Naxos, accompanied by a nurse named Korkyne, whose tomb they show; and that this Ariadne also died there.

In a kylix by the painter Aison (c. 425 – c. 410 BC), (Note: The kylix is conserved at the National Archaeological Museum of Spain, Madrid; see image.) Theseus drags the Minotaur from a temple-like labyrinth, yet the goddess who attends him in this Attic representation is Athena.

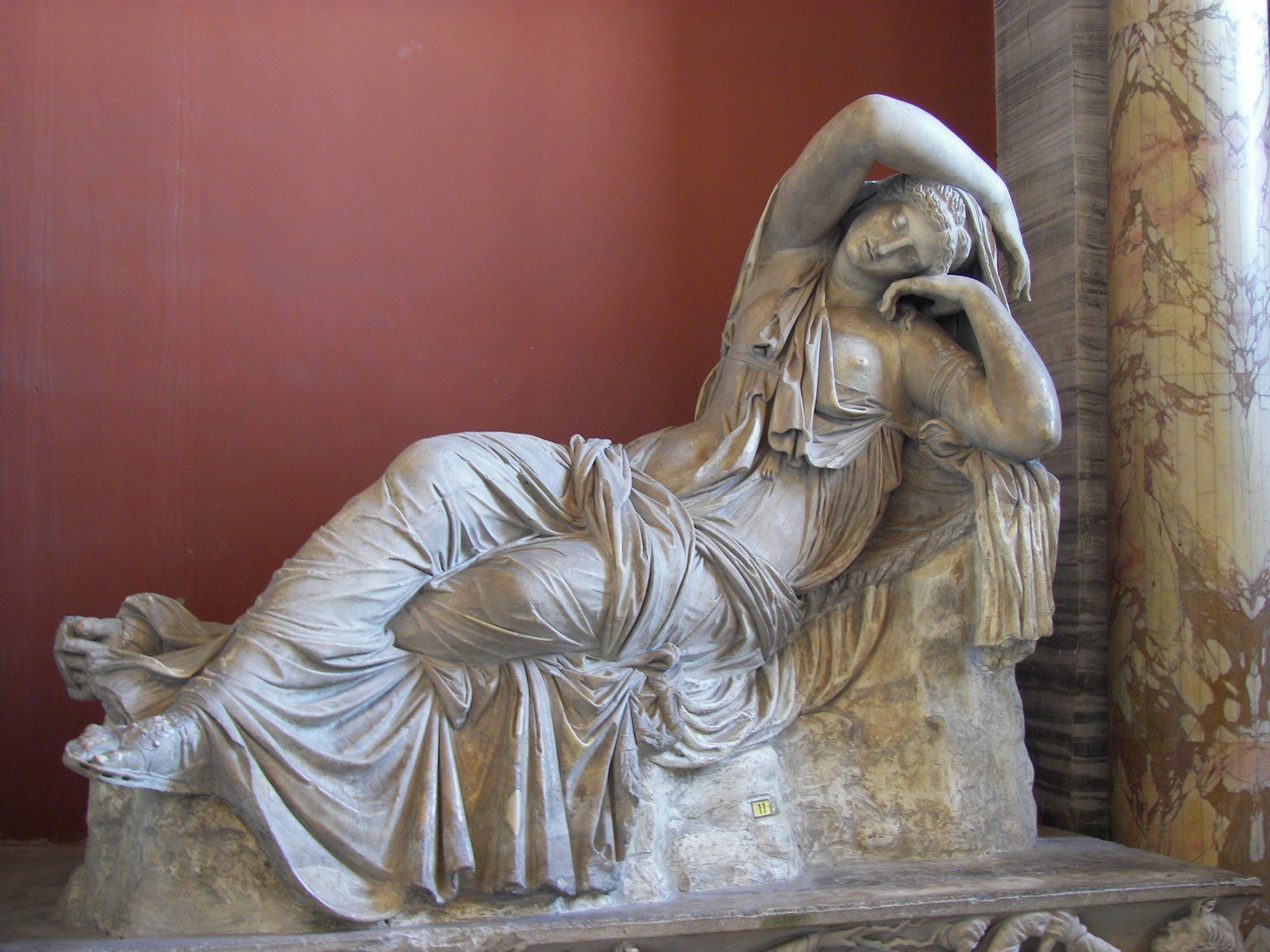
The Vatican Sleeping Ariadne, long erroneously identified as Cleopatra, a Roman marble in late Hellenistic style

An ancient cult of Aphrodite-Ariadne was observed at Amathus, Cyprus, according to the obscure Hellenistic mythographer Paeon of Amathus; his works are lost, but his narrative is among the sources that Plutarch cited in his vita of Theseus (20.3–5). According to the myth that was current at Amathus, the second most important Cypriot cult centre of Aphrodite, Theseus's ship was swept off course and the pregnant and suffering Ariadne put ashore in the storm. Theseus, attempting to secure the ship, was inadvertently swept out to sea, thus being absolved of abandoning Ariadne. The Cypriot women cared for Ariadne, who died in childbirth and was memorialized in a shrine. Theseus, overcome with grief upon his return, left money for sacrifices to Ariadne and ordered two cult images, one of silver and one of bronze, erected.

At the observation in her honour on the second day of the month Gorpiaeus, a young man lay on the ground and vicariously experienced the throes of labour. The sacred grove in which the shrine was located was denominated the "Grove of Aphrodite-Ariadne". According to Cypriot legend, Ariadne's tomb was located within the temenos of the sanctuary of Aphrodite-Ariadne. The primitive nature of the cult at Amathus in this narrative appears to be much older than the Athenian sanctioned shrine of Aphrodite, who at Amathus received "Ariadne" (derived from "hagne", "sacred") as an epithet.

=== Libera ===
The Roman author Hyginus identified Ariadne as the Roman Libera, bride to Liber.

== Festivals ==
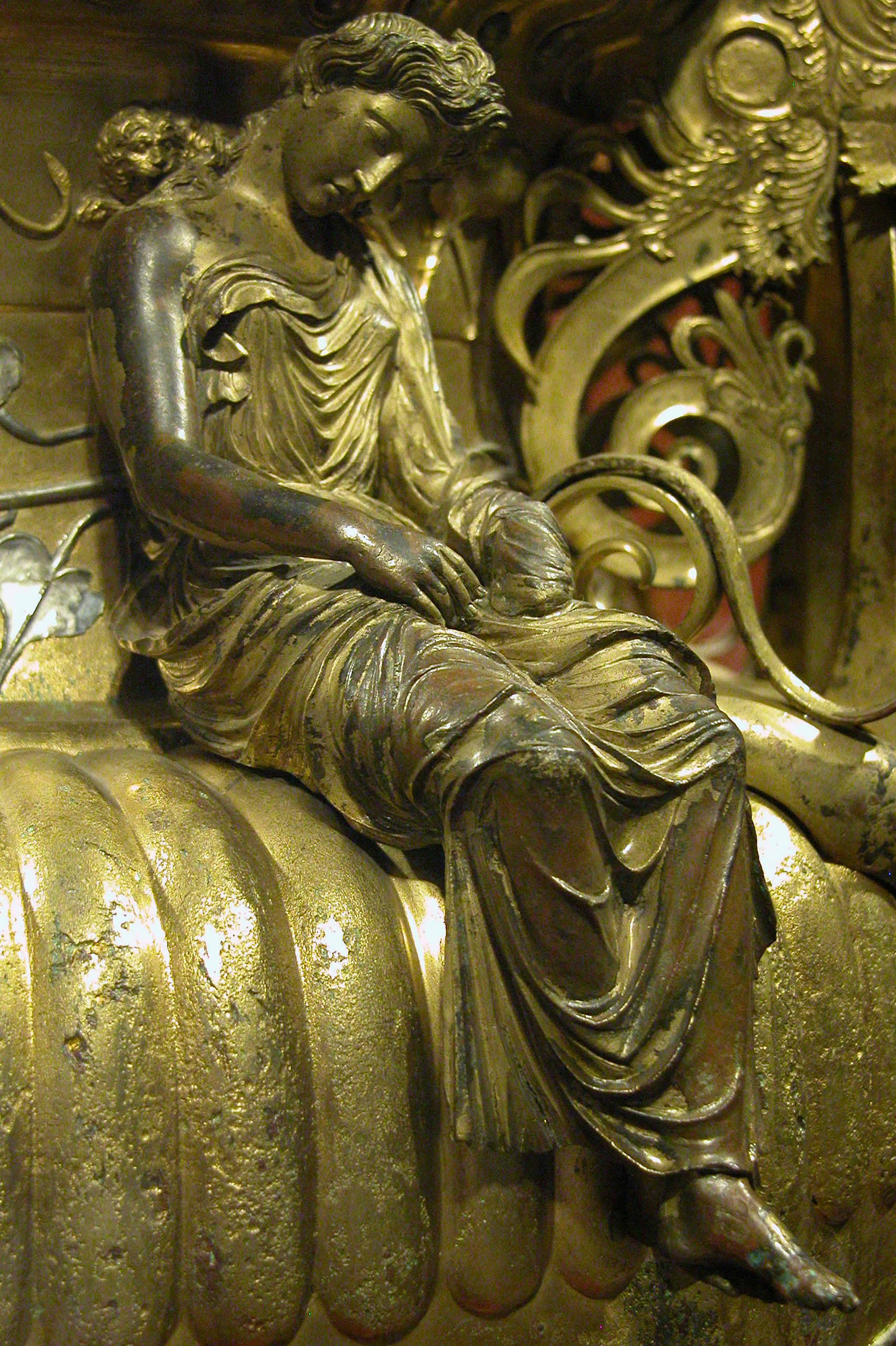
Ariadne on the Derveni krater

Ariadneia (ἀριάδνεια) festivals honored Ariadne and were held in Naxos and Cyprus. According to Plutarch, some Naxians believed there were two Ariadnes, one of which died on the island of Naxos after being abandoned by Theseus. The Ariadneia festival honors Naxos as the place of her death with sacrifices and mourning. Paeon, as stated by Plutarch, attributes the Ariadneia festival in Cyprus to Theseus, who left money to the island so sacrifices could be made to commemorate Ariadne. Sacrifices were held in the grove of Ariadne Aphrodite, where Ariadne's tomb resided. During these sacrifices, a young man shall lie down and mimic a woman in labour by crying out and gesturing on the second day of the month, Gorpiaeus. One silver and one bronze statuette were also constructed in her honor.

== In Etruscan culture ==
An illustration of the 5th-Century BC bronze mirror with Menrva, Fufluns, Artumes, Esia and Silenus (head) as mentioned below

In Etruscan, Ariadne was called Areatha. Areatha is paired with Fufluns (an Etruscan figure with whom Dionysus was identified) on Etruscan engraved bronze mirror backs, where the Athenian cultural hero Theseus is absent, and Semla (Greek Semele, the mother of Dionysus) may accompany the pair. On a late-5th-century BC bronze mirror, a maiden named Esia is shown being carried by Artumes (Greek Artemis) and presented to Fufluns and Menrva (Roman Minerva). This has led some scholars to interpret Esia as an Etruscan form of Ariadne, although Nancy Thomson de Grummond is sceptical of this idea.

== Cultural depictions ==
Some examples of works inspired by the myth of Ariadne are:

- Ariadne auf Naxos (1912 Opera)
- Bacchus and Ariadne (1820 oil painting)
- Bacchus and Ariadne (1819 poem)
- Ariadne abandoned by Theseus (1774 oil painting)
- Ariadne (1804 oil painting)
- Ariadne (1932 short epic poem)
- Ariadne (1912 Oil and graphite painting)
- Ariadne auf Naxos (1775 one act)
- Ariane et Barbe-bleue (1907 opera)
- Bacchus and Ariadne (1933 ballet)
- Bacchus, Venus, and Ariadne (1576-77 oil painting)
- Ariadne musica (1702 collection of organ music)
- Ariane et Bacchus (1696 opera)
- Ariadne (2021 novel by Jennifer Saint)

== Art Depicting Ariadne ==
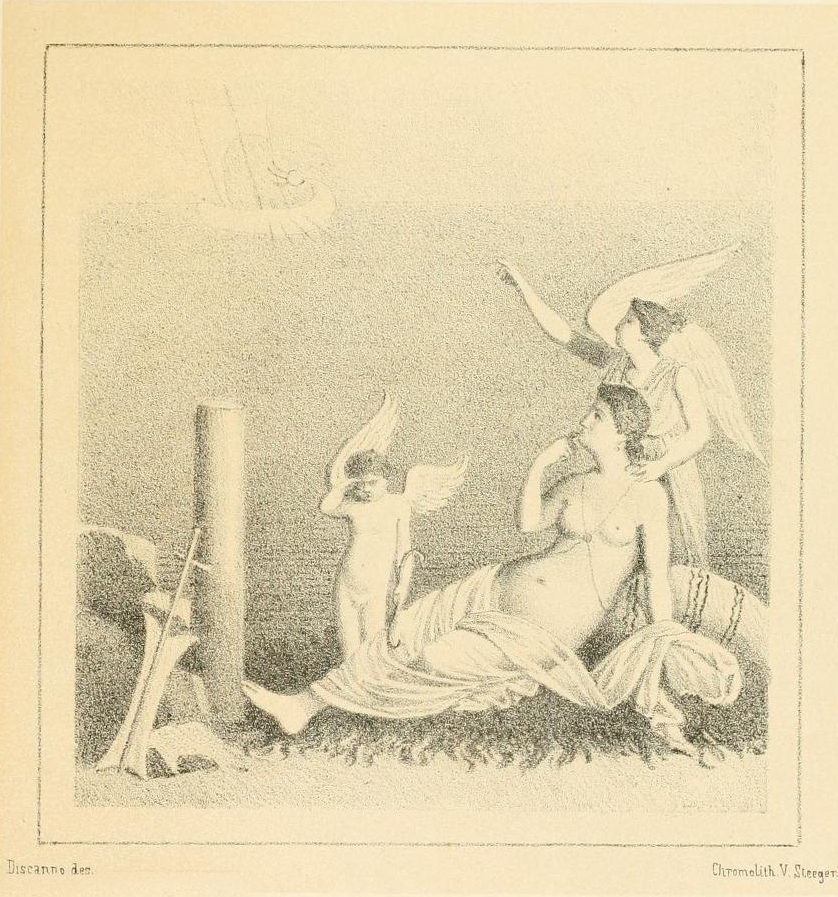
Ariadne abandoned on Naxos House of the Greek Epigrams Pompeii Plate IX by Geremia Discanno 02.jpg

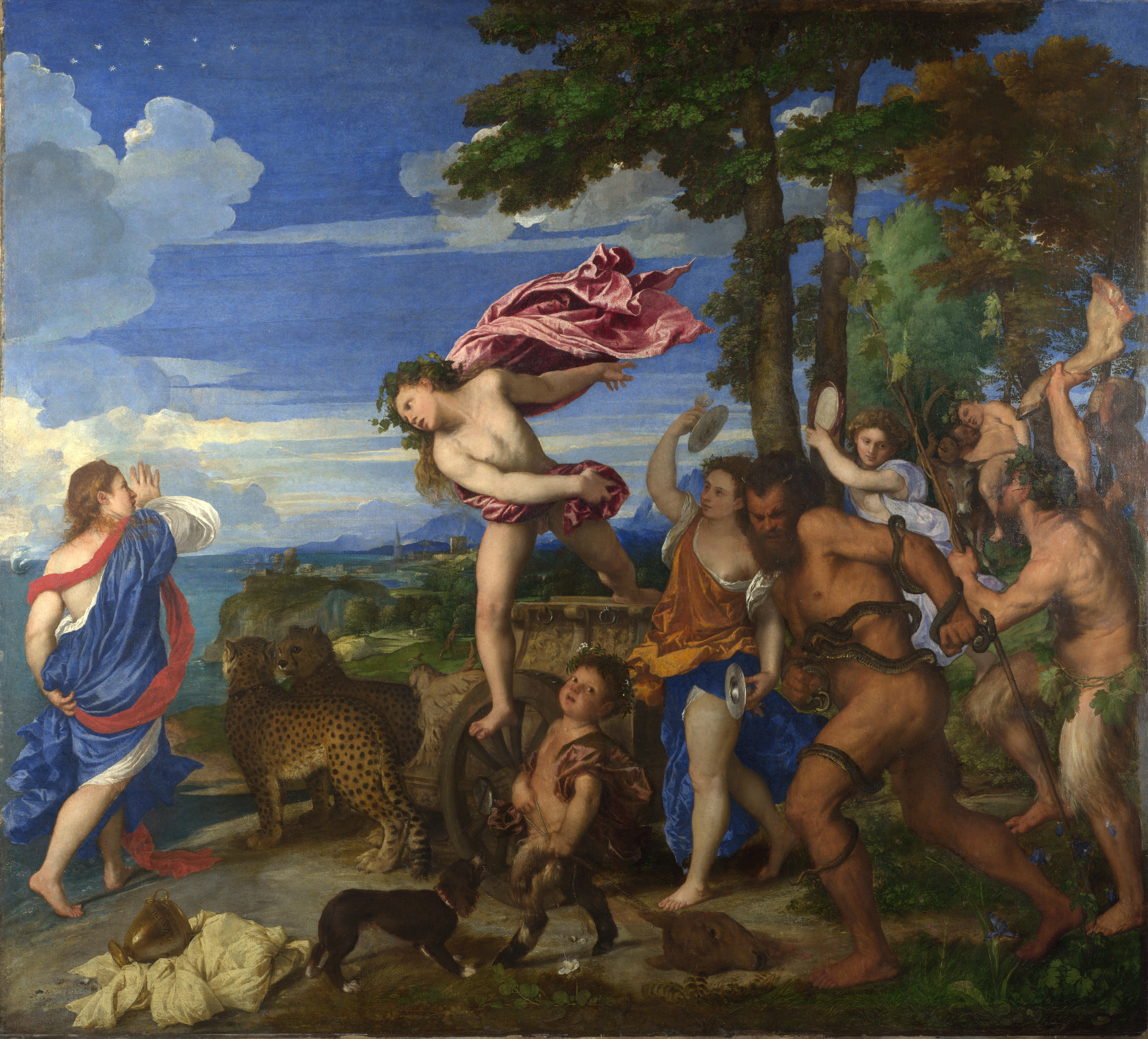
Titian Bacchus and Ariadne.jpg

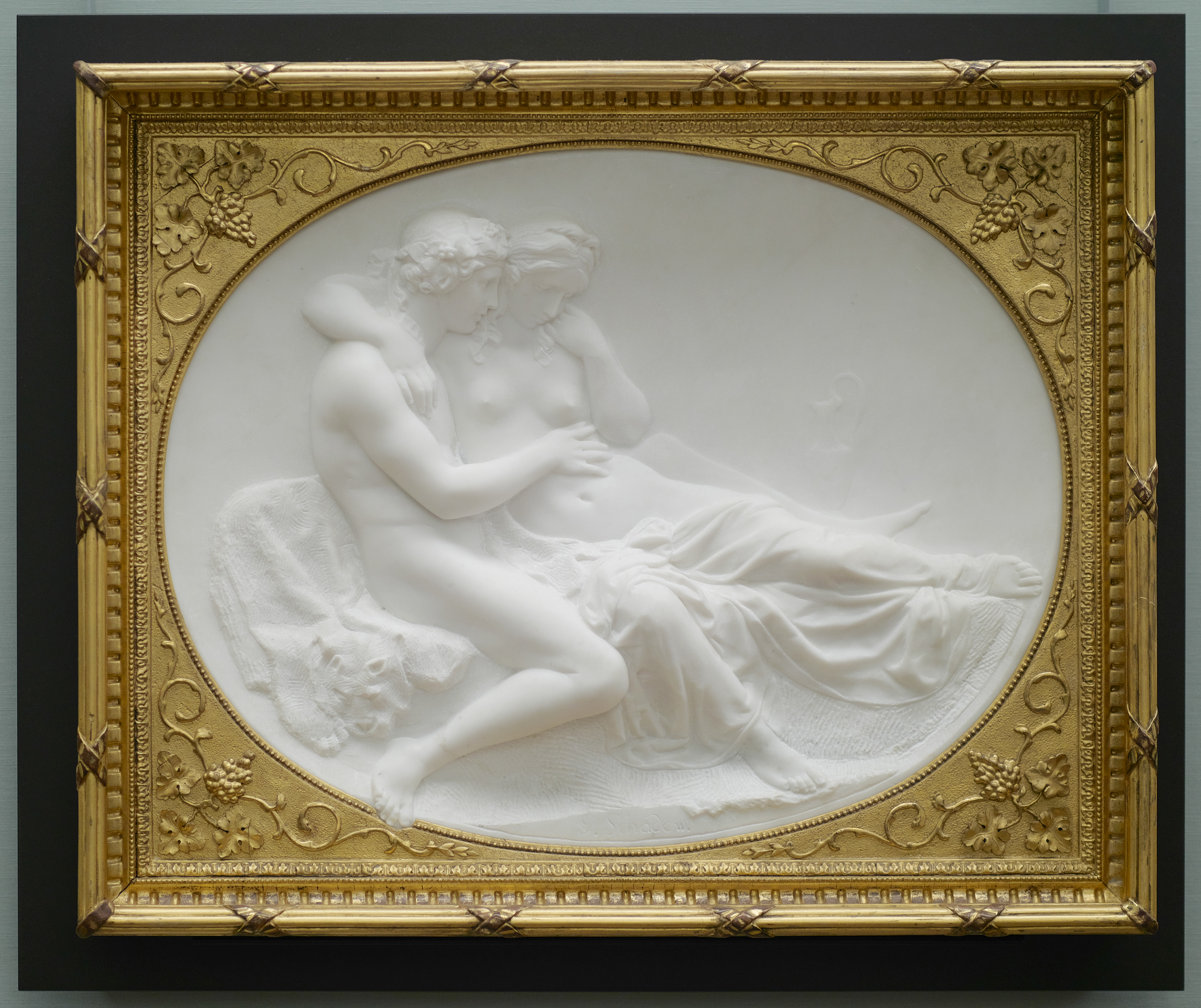
Schadow.Bacchus.troestet.Ariadne

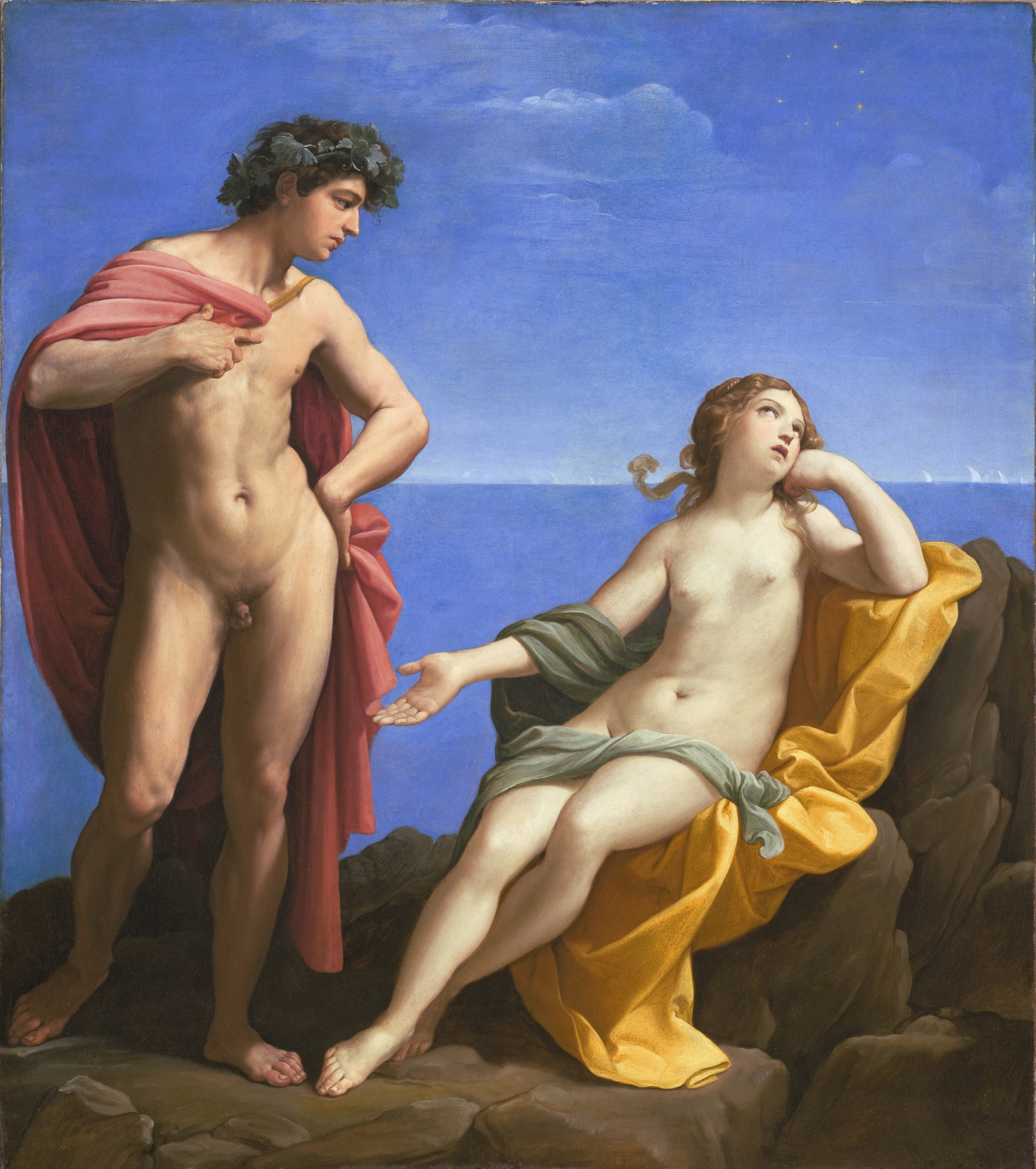
Reni, Guido - Bacchus and Ariadne

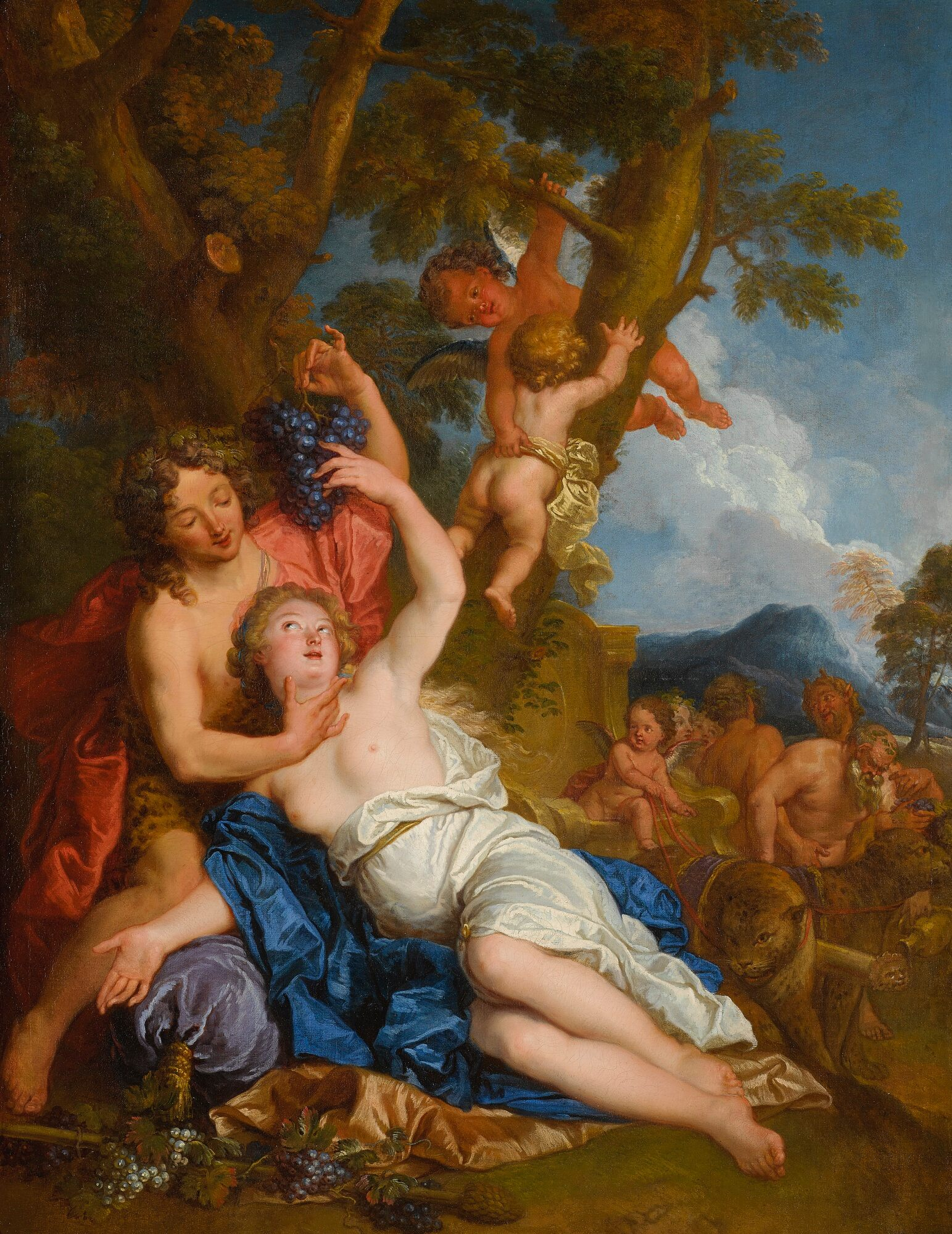
François Marot - Bacchus and Ariadne

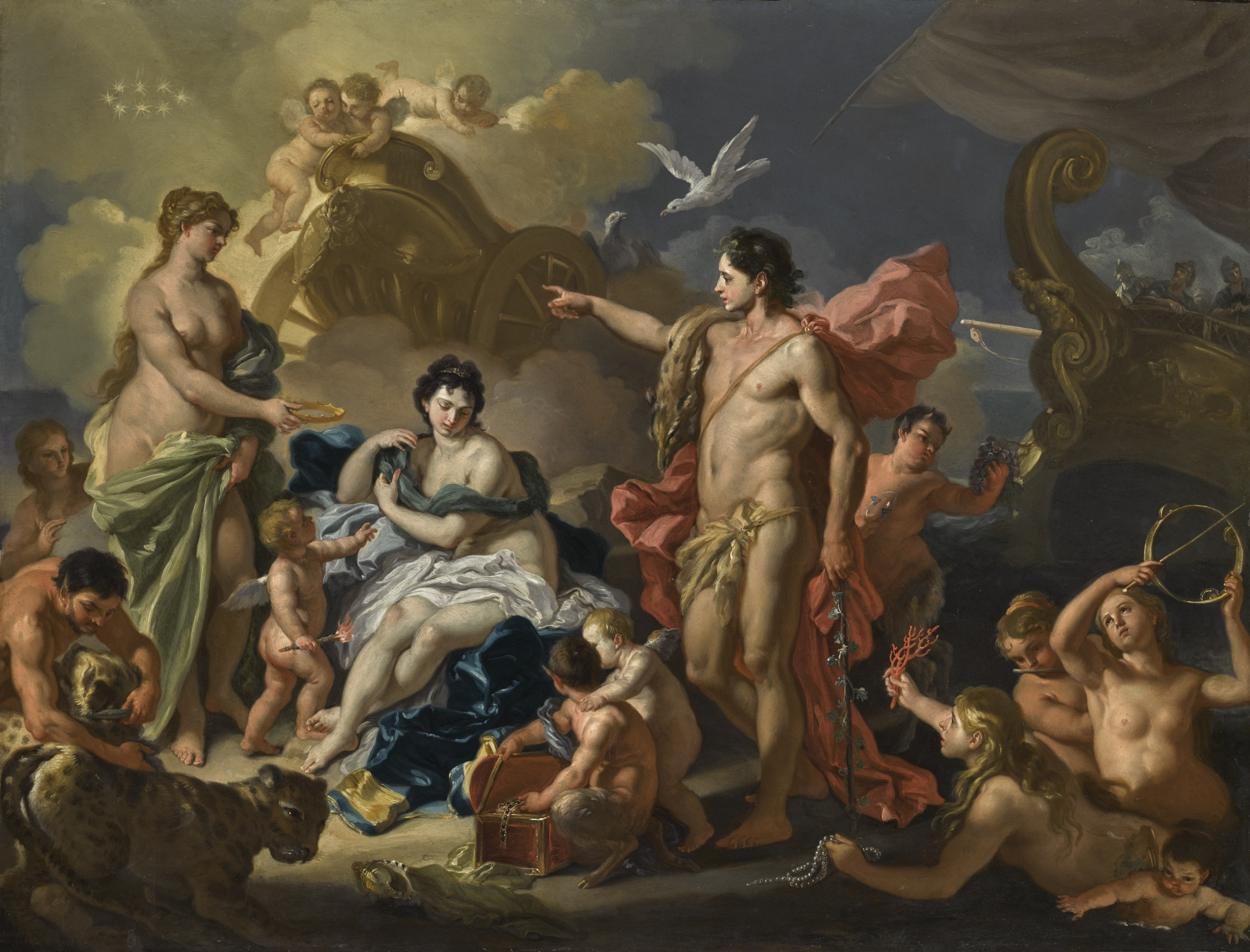
Bacchus and Ariadne by Francesco Solimena

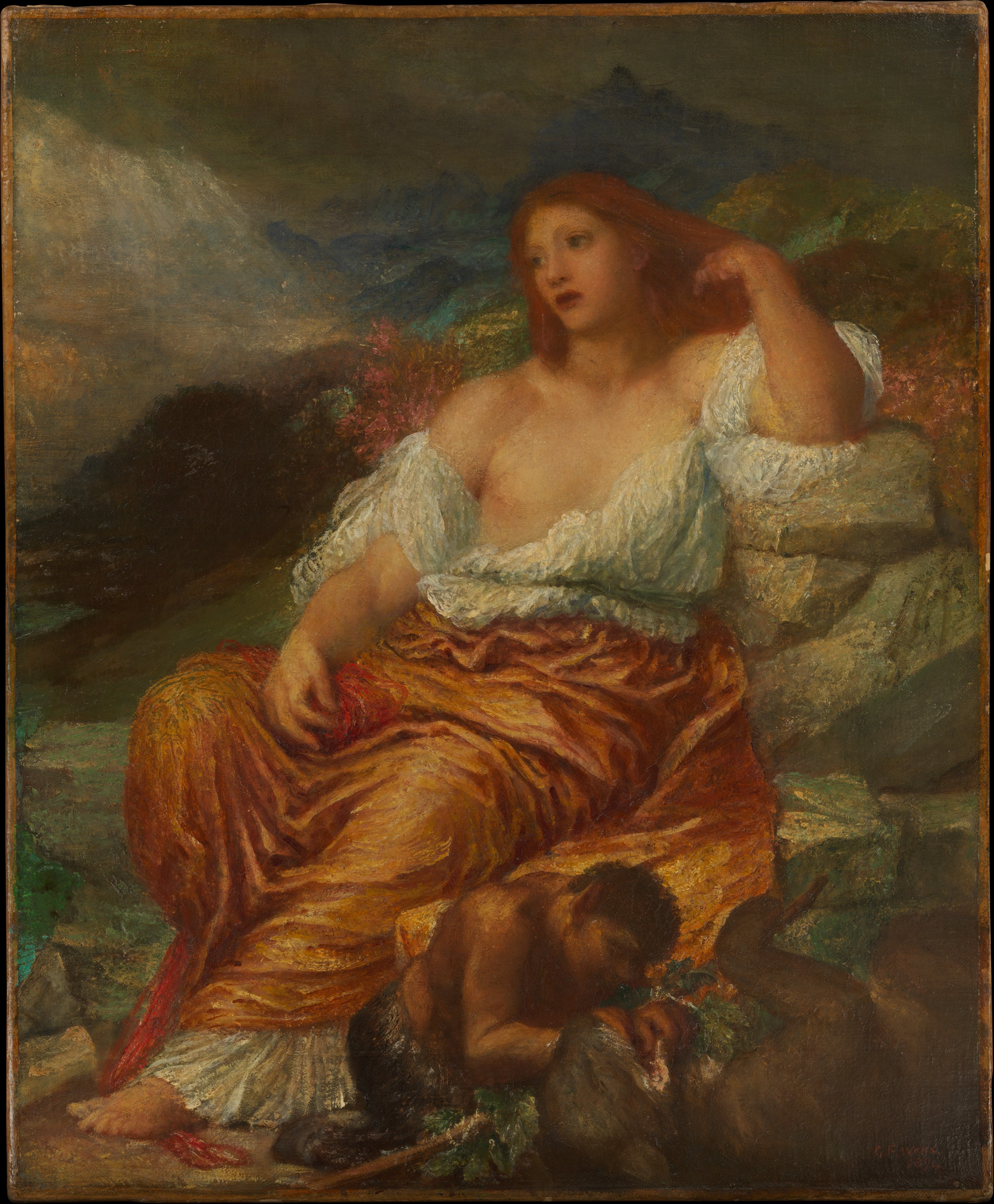
Ariadne by George Frederic Watts

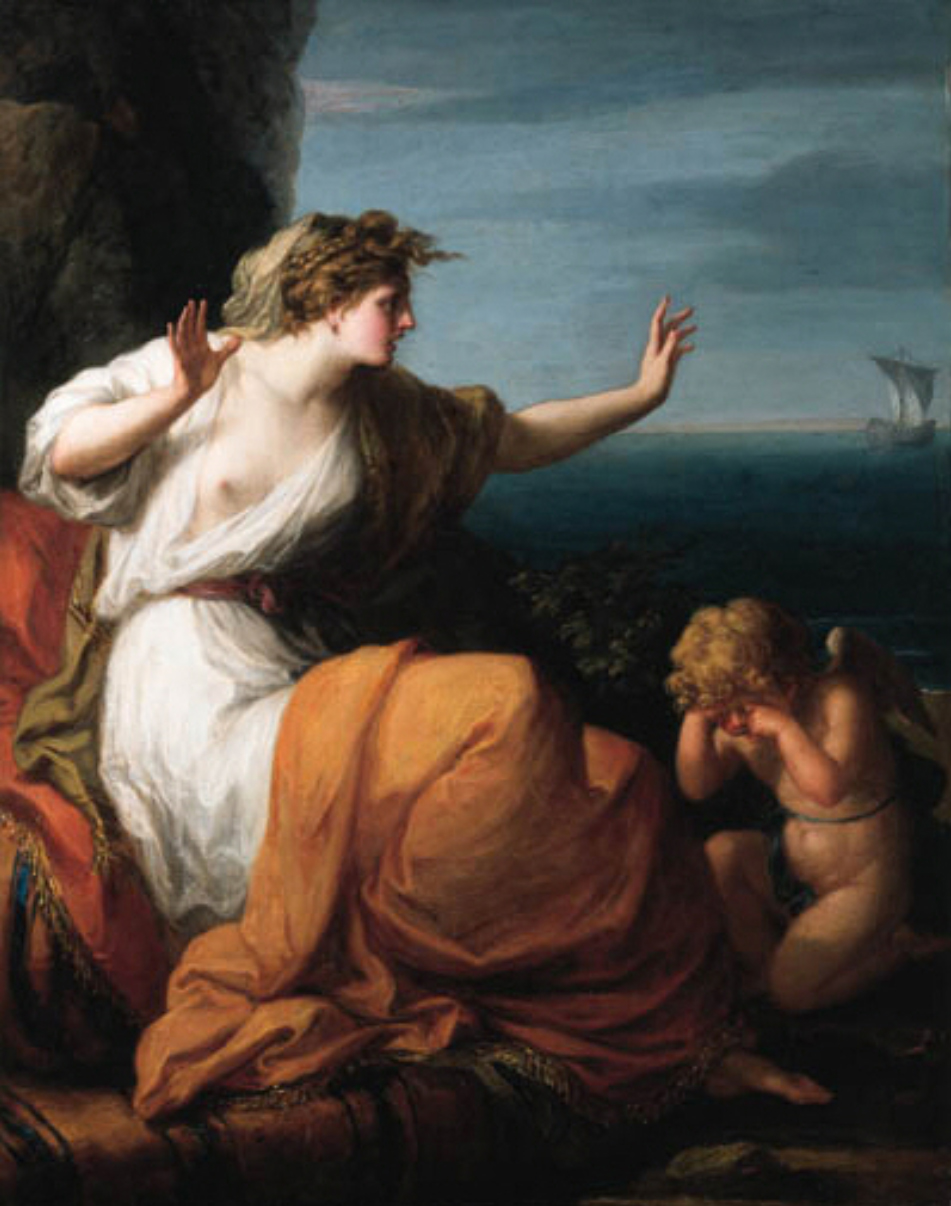
Ariadne. Angelica Kauffmann

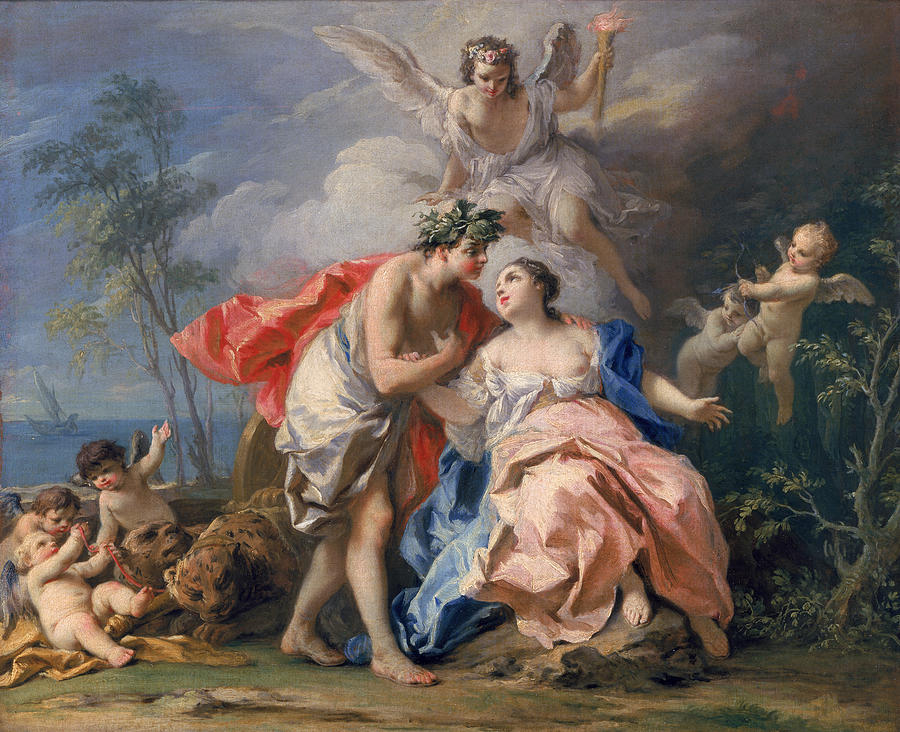
Bacchus and Ariadne by Jacopo Amigoni

== Bibliography ==
- Alexiou, Stylianos (1969). Minoan Civilization. Translated by Ridley, Cressida (6th revised ed.). Heraklion, Greece.
- De Grummond, Nancy Thomson, Etruscan Myth, Sacred History, and Legend, Philadelphia, University of Pennsylvania Museum of Archaeology and Anthropology, 2006. ISBN 1931707863.
- Hanks, Patrick; Hodges, Flavia (1997). A Concise Dictionary of First Names (Revised ed.). New York City, United States: Oxford University Press. ISBN 978-0198662594.
- Henry Liddell; Robert Scott (1940). Jones, Henry Stuart (ed.). A Greek–English Lexicon. Clarendon Press.
- Kerenyi, Karl. Dionysos: Archetypal Image of Indestructible Life, part I.iii "The Cretan core of the Dionysos myth" Princeton: Princeton University Press, 1976.
- Peck, Harry Thurston. Harpers Dictionary of Classical Antiquities (1898).
- Ruck, Carl A. P. and Danny Staples. The World of Classical Myth. Durham: Carolina Academic Press, 1994.
- Barthes, Roland, "Camera Lucida". Barthes quotes Nietzsche, "A labyrinthine man never seeks the truth, but only his Ariadne," using Ariadne in reference to his mother, who had recently died.
