= Aras (mythology) =

In Greek mythology, Aras (Ancient Greek: Ἄραντά or Ἄραντός) was an autochthon who was believed to have built Arantea, the most ancient town in Phliasia, Peloponnese.

== Family ==
Aras had a son named Aoris, and a daughter called Araethyrea.

== Mythology ==
Araethyrea was said to have been fond of chase and warlike pursuits; she was also the mother of Phlias by Dionysus. When she died, her brother called the country of Phliasia after her Araethyrea. The monuments of Araethyrea and her brother, consisting of round pillars, were still extant in the time of Pausanias; and before the mysteries of Demeter were commenced at Phlius, the people always invoked Aras and his two children with their faces turned towards their monuments.
