= Chthonophyle =

Woman of Hermes

In Greek mythology, Chthonophyle (Ancient Greek: Χθονοφύλη) was the daughter of King Sicyon (whose name was given to the city of Sicyon) and Zeuxippe. She and Hermes are the parents of Polybus, another king of Sicyon. She married Phlias, son of Dionysus and Araethyrea, and had by him another son, Androdamas. Other sources instead give her, and not Araethyrea, as the mother of Phlias with Dionysus.
