= Araethyrea (Argolis) =

Araethyrea or Araithyrea (/ˌærəˈθɪriə/; Ancient Greek: Ἀραιθυρέα) was the ancient capital of Phliasia, in ancient Argolis. It is said by Pausanias to have been originally named Arantia (Ἀραντία), after Aras, its mythical founder, and to have been called Araethyrea after Araethyrea, a daughter of Aras. The name of its founder was retained in the time of Pausanias in the hill Arantinus, on which it stood. Araethyrea is mentioned by Homer in the Catalogue of Ships in the Iliad. We learn from Strabo that its inhabitants quitted Araethyrea, and founded Phlius, at the distance of 30 stadia from the former town. Hence the statement of the grammarians, that Araethyrea and Arantia were both ancient names of Phlius.

Its site is unlocated.
