= Phlius =

Ancient city in Greece

Coordinates: 37°50′47″N 22°38′57″E

Location of Phlius

Phlius (/ˈflaɪəs/; Ancient Greek: Φλιοῦς) or Phleius (Φλειοῦς) was an independent polis (city-state) in the northeastern part of Peloponnesus. Phlius' territory, called Phliasia (Φλιασία), was bounded on the north by Sicyonia, on the west by Arcadia, on the east by Cleonae, and on the south by Argolis. This territory is a small valley about 900 feet (270 m) above the level of the sea, surrounded by mountains, from which streams flow down on every side, joining the river Asopus in the middle of the plain. The mountain in the southern part of the plain, from which the principal source of the Asopus springs, was called Carneates (Καρνεάτης). The territory of Phlius was celebrated in antiquity for its wine. According to Strabo, the ancient capital of the country was Araethyrea (Ἀραιθυρέα) on Mt. Celosse, which city is mentioned by Homer; but the inhabitants subsequently deserted it and built Phlius at the distance of 30 stadia. Pausanias, however, does not speak of any migration, but says that the ancient capital was named Arantia (Ἀραντία), from its founder Aras, an autochthon, that it was afterwards called Araethyrea from a daughter of Aras, and that it finally received the name of Phlius, from Phlias, a son of Ceisus and grandson of Temenus. The name of Arantia was retained in the time of Pausanias in the hill Arantinus, on which the city stood. Hence the statement of grammarians that both Arantia and Araethyrea were ancient names of Phlius. According to Stephanus of Byzantium, Phlius derived its name from Dionysus and Chthonophyle. Phlius was subsequently conquered by Dorians under Rhegnidas, who came from Sicyon. Some of the inhabitants migrated to Samos, others to Clazomenae; among the settlers at Samos was Hippasus, from whom Pythagoras derived his descent.

Like most of the other Doric states, Phlius was governed by an aristocracy, though it was for a time subject to a tyrant Leon, a contemporary of Pythagoras. Phlius sent 200 soldiers to the Battle of Thermopylae, and 1000 to the Battle of Plataea. Although geographically close to Argos, it was an ally of Sparta and a member of the Peloponnesian League. During the whole of the Peloponnesian War it remained faithful to Sparta and hostile to Argos.

== Classical Phlius ==
Phlius remained as a stalwart ally of Sparta during the Peloponnesian War, although it refrained from sending out large detachments of men from its otherwise limited population of around 5,000 male citizens. This pro-Spartan alliance was largely a result of Phliousian fears of Argive expansion, as Argos sought to assert itself in the Peloponnesus. It is likely that despite its alliance with Sparta, Phlius was a democratic state at the turn of the 4th century, although this later changed following episodes of stasis in the city.

Like many other cities of ancient Greece, Phlius fell into civil strife between a democratic and an oligarchic faction during the 4th century BCE. Before 393 BCE a change seems to have taken place in the government, for in that year we find some of the citizens in exile who professed to be the friends of the Lacedaemonians. The Phliasians, however, still continued faithful to Sparta and suffered a severe defeat from the Athenian General Iphicrates that same year. The citizens were seized by panic following this defeat and requested a Lacedaemonian garrison within their walls, which they had been unwilling to do before, lest their allies should restore the exiles. But the Lacedaemonians did not betray the confidence placed in them, and quitted the city without making any change in the government. Ten years afterwards (383 BCE) the exiles induced the Spartan government to support their cause; and following the recent destruction of Mantineia, the Phliasians thought it more prudent to comply with the request of the Spartans, and received the exiles. But disputes arising between returned exiles and those who were in possession of the government, the former again appealed to Sparta, and Agesilaus was sent with an army in 380 BCE to reduce the city. At this period Phlius contained 5000 citizens. Agesilaus laid siege to the city, which held out for a year and eight months. It was at length obliged to surrender through the exhaustion of provisions in 379 BCE; and Agesilaus appointed a council of 100 members (half from the exiles and half from friends of the exiles which had remained in the city), with powers of life and death over the citizens, and authorized. them to frame a new constitution. From this time the Phliasians remained faithful to Sparta throughout the whole of the Theban War, though they had to suffer much from the devastation of their territory by their hostile neighbors. Later, the Argives occupied and fortified Tricaranum above Phlius, and the Sicyonians Thyamia on the Sicyonian frontier. In 368 BCE the city was nearly taken by the exiles, who no doubt belonged to the democratic party that had been driven into exile after the capture of the city by Agesilaus. In this year a body of Arcadians and Eleians, who were marching through Nemea to join Epaminondas at the Isthmus, were persuaded by the Phliasian exiles to assist them in capturing the city. During the night the exiles stole to the foot of the acropolis; and in the morning when the scouts stationed by the citizens on the hill Tricaranum announced that the enemy were in sight, the exiles seized the opportunity to scale the acropolis, of which they obtained possession. They were, however, repulsed in their attempt to force their way into the town, and were eventually obliged to abandon the citadel also. The Arcadians and Argives were at the same time repulsed from the walls. In the following year Phlius was exposed to a still more formidable attack from the Theban commander at Sicyon, assisted by Euphron, tyrant of that city. The main body of the army descended from Tricaranum to the Heraeum which stood at the foot of the mountain, in order to ravage the Phliasian plain. At the same time a detachment of Sicyonians and Pellenians were posted northeast of the acropolis before the Corinthian gate to hinder the Phliasians from attacking them in their rear. But the main body of the troops was repulsed; and being unable to join the detachment of Sicyonians and Pellenians in consequence of a ravine (Φαράγξ), the Phliasians attacked and defeated them with loss.

After the death of Alexander the Great, Phlius, like many of the other Peloponnesian cities, became subject to tyrants; but upon the organisation of the Achaean League by Aratus of Sicyon, Cleonymus, who was then tyrant of Phlius, voluntarily resigned his power, and the city joined the league.

Phlius is celebrated in the history of literature as the birthplace of Pratinas, the inventor of the Satyric drama, and who contended with Aeschylus for the prize at Athens. In the agora of Phlius was the tomb of Aristias, the son of Pratinas. It was also the hometown of Plato's female student Axiothea of Phlius.

Pausanias, who visited in the 2nd century, says that on the acropolis of Phlius was a temple of Hebe or Ganymeda, in a cypress grove, which enjoyed the right of asylum. There was also a temple of Demeter on the acropolis. On descending from the citadel there stood on the right a temple of Asclepius, and below it the theatre and another temple of Demeter. In the agora there were also other public buildings.

The site of ancient Phlius is located near the modern Nemea.

== See also ==
- List of ancient Greek cities

== Sources ==
- Fine, John V.A. The Ancient Greeks: A critical history (Harvard University Press, 1983) ISBN 0-674-03314-0
- Hachtmann, Vasco (2022). Mensch und Landschaft im frühen Griechenland die Siedlungsdynamik der Mittel- und Spätbronzezeit im Becken von Phlious (Korinthia, Nordostpeloponnes). Bonn: Rudolf Habelt. ISBN 9783774943032.
- Xenophon (1890s) [original 4th century BC]. Hellenica . Translated by Henry Graham Dakyns – via Wikisource.
