= Arantia =

Scientific classification
- Kingdom: Animalia
- Phylum: Arthropoda
- Clade: Pancrustacea
- Class: Insecta
- Order: Orthoptera
- Suborder: Ensifera
- Family: Tettigoniidae
- Subfamily: Phaneropterinae
- Tribe: Holochlorini
- Genus: Arantia; Stål, 1874

Genus of insects

External image
- Images at iNaturalist

Arantia is a genus of bush crickets in the tribe Holochlorini, erected by Carl Stål in 1874, with species found in tropical Africa.

== Species ==
- Arantia accrana Karsch, 1889
- Arantia angustipennis Chopard, 1954
- Arantia brevipes Chopard, 1954
- Arantia congensis Griffini, 1908
- Arantia dentata Saussure, 1899
- Arantia excelsior Karsch, 1889
- Arantia fasciata Walker, 1869
- Arantia fatidica (Stål, 1873)
  - type species (as Holochlora fatidica Stål)
- Arantia gabunensis Brunner von Wattenwyl, 1891
- Arantia gestri Griffini, 1906
- Arantia hydatinoptera Karsch, 1889
- Arantia incerata Karsch, 1893
- Arantia latifolia Karsch, 1890
- Arantia leptocnemis Karsch, 1890
- Arantia mammisignum Karsch, 1896
- Arantia manca Bolívar, 1906
- Arantia marmorata Karsch, 1889
- Arantia mauritiana Saussure, 1899
- Arantia melanotus Sjöstedt, 1902
- Arantia orthocnemis Karsch, 1890
- Arantia ovalipennis Chopard, 1954
- Arantia rectifolia Brunner von Wattenwyl, 1878
- Arantia regina Karsch, 1889
- Arantia retinervis Karsch, 1889
- Arantia scurra Karsch, 1896
- Arantia simplicinervis Karsch, 1889
- Arantia tigrina Bolívar, 1906
- Arantia ugandana Rehn, 1914
