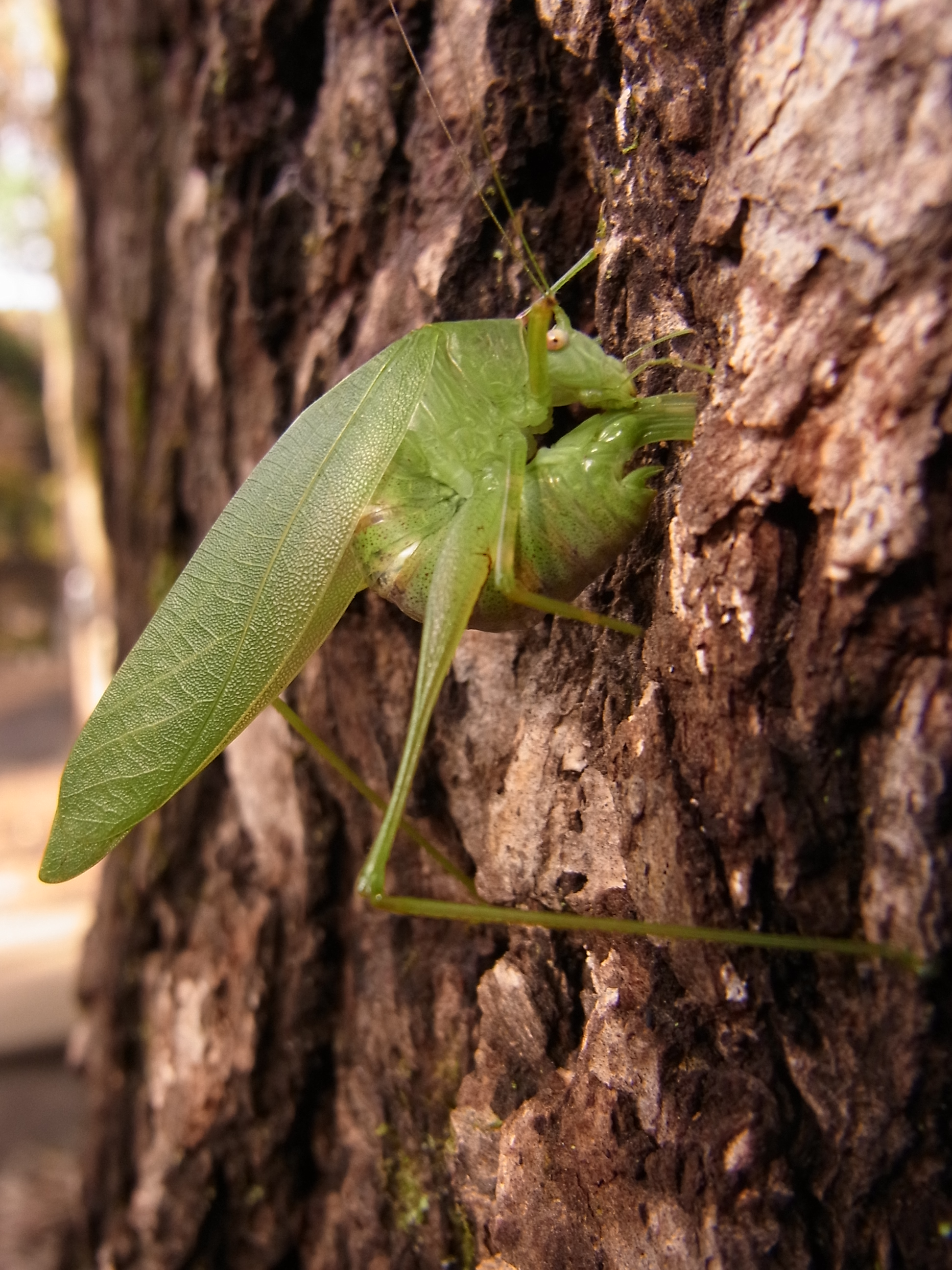
- In Tokyo, Japan

Scientific classification
- Domain: Eukaryota
- Kingdom: Animalia
- Phylum: Arthropoda
- Class: Insecta
- Order: Orthoptera
- Suborder: Ensifera
- Family: Tettigoniidae
- Subfamily: Phaneropterinae
- Genus: Holochlora
- Species: H. japonica

Binomial name
- Holochlora japonica Brunner von Wattenwyl, 1878

Synonyms
- Holochlora nawae Matsumura & Shiraki, 1908

= Holochlora japonica =

Species of cricket-like animal

Holochlora japonica, the Japanese broadwinged katydid, is a species of katydid or bush cricket native to eastern Asia in the large subfamily Phaneropterinae.

The Japanese broadwinged katydid was first described in 1878 by Swiss entomologist Carl Brunner von Wattenwyl in his Monographie der Phaneropteriden. The type locality is in Japan.

== Description ==
It is a medium sized bush cricket with a green body: the length of the type specimen, a male, is 21 mm (0.83 in). The ovipositor of females is darkened at the tip, with black, serrated lines on the sides.

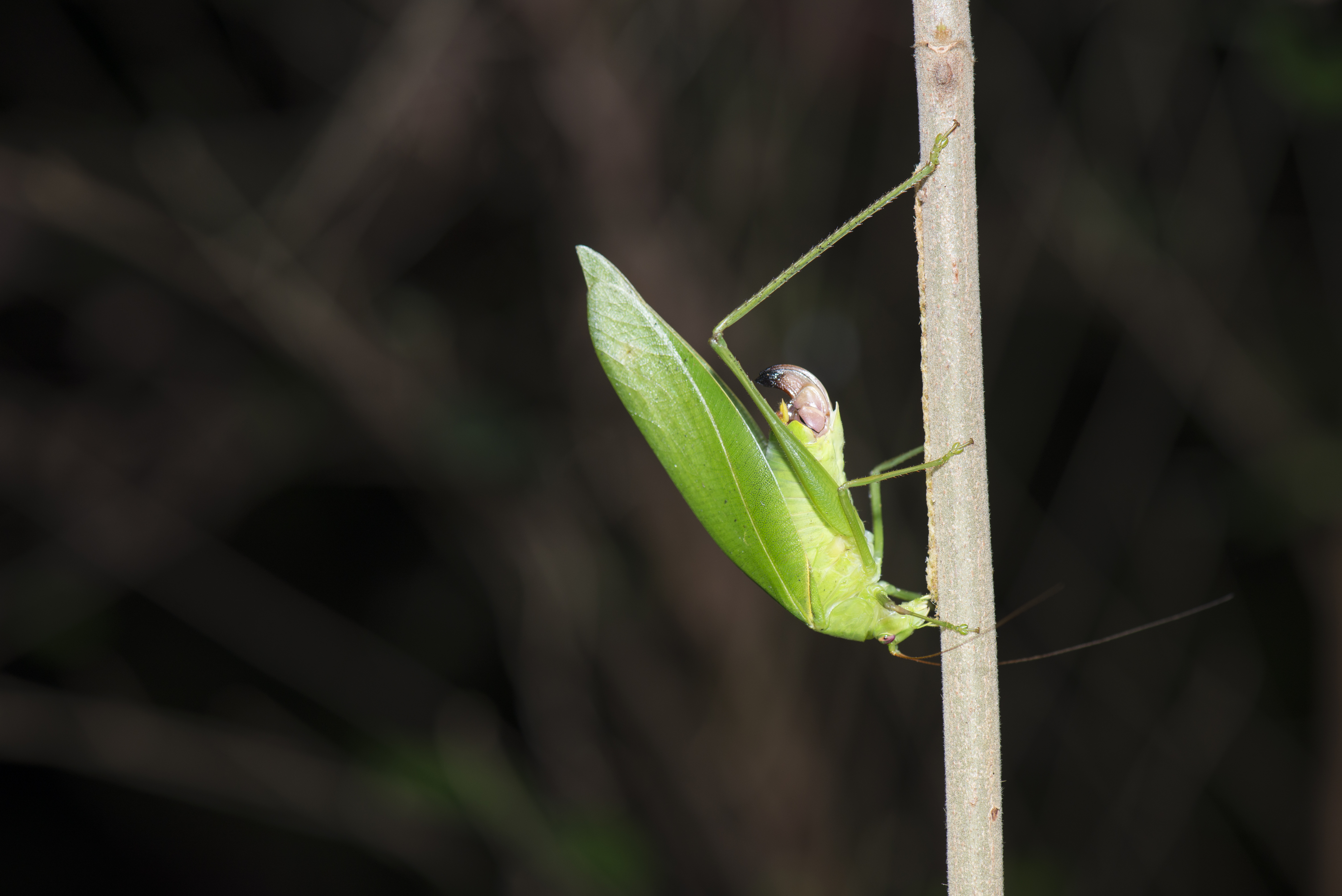
female

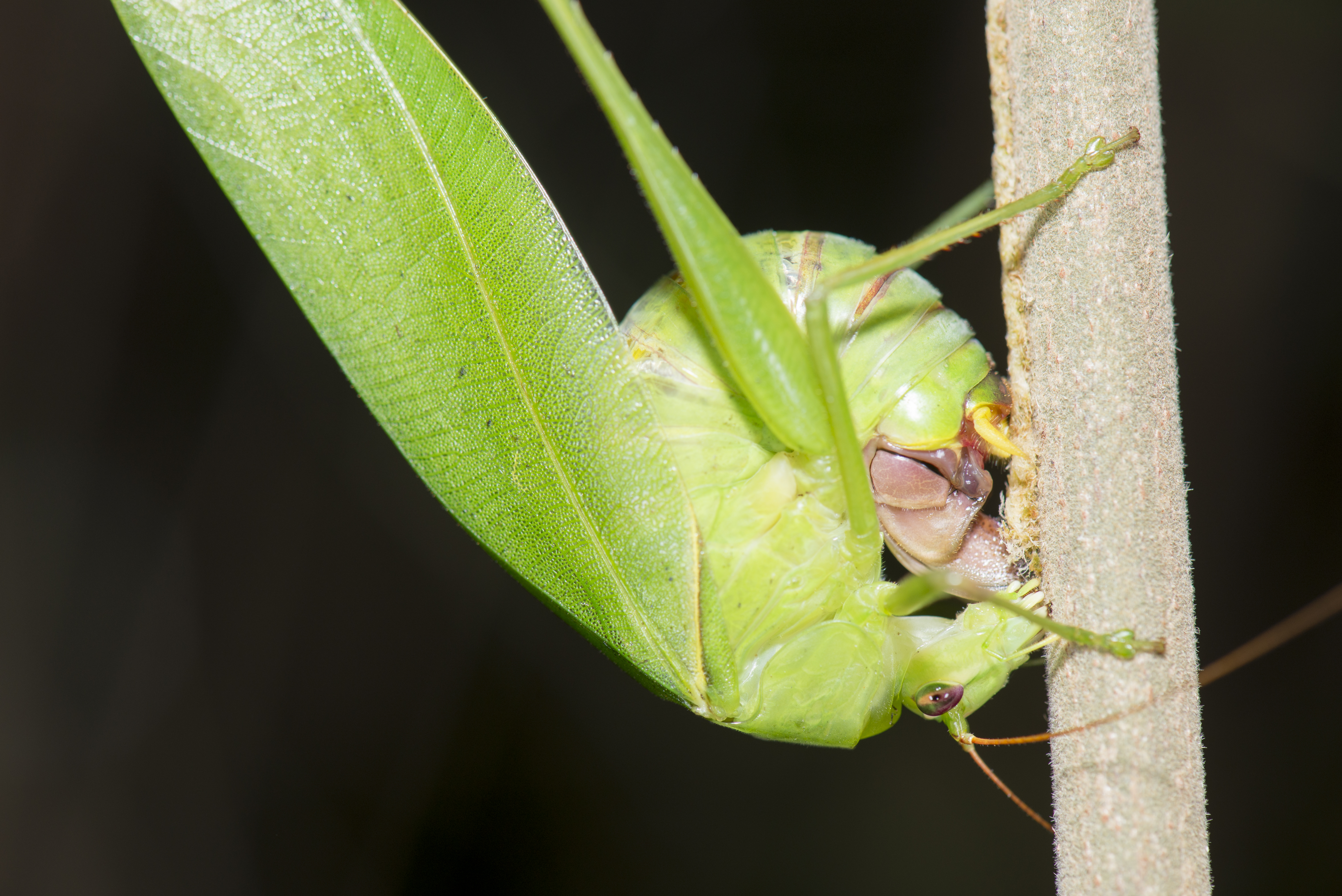
egg laying
