= Androdamas =

In Greek mythology, Androdamas (Ancient Greek: Ἀνδροδάμας means 'man-taming') was the Sicyonian son of Phlias and Chthonophyle, daughter of King Sicyon.
