= Oschophoria =

Ancient Greek festival rites

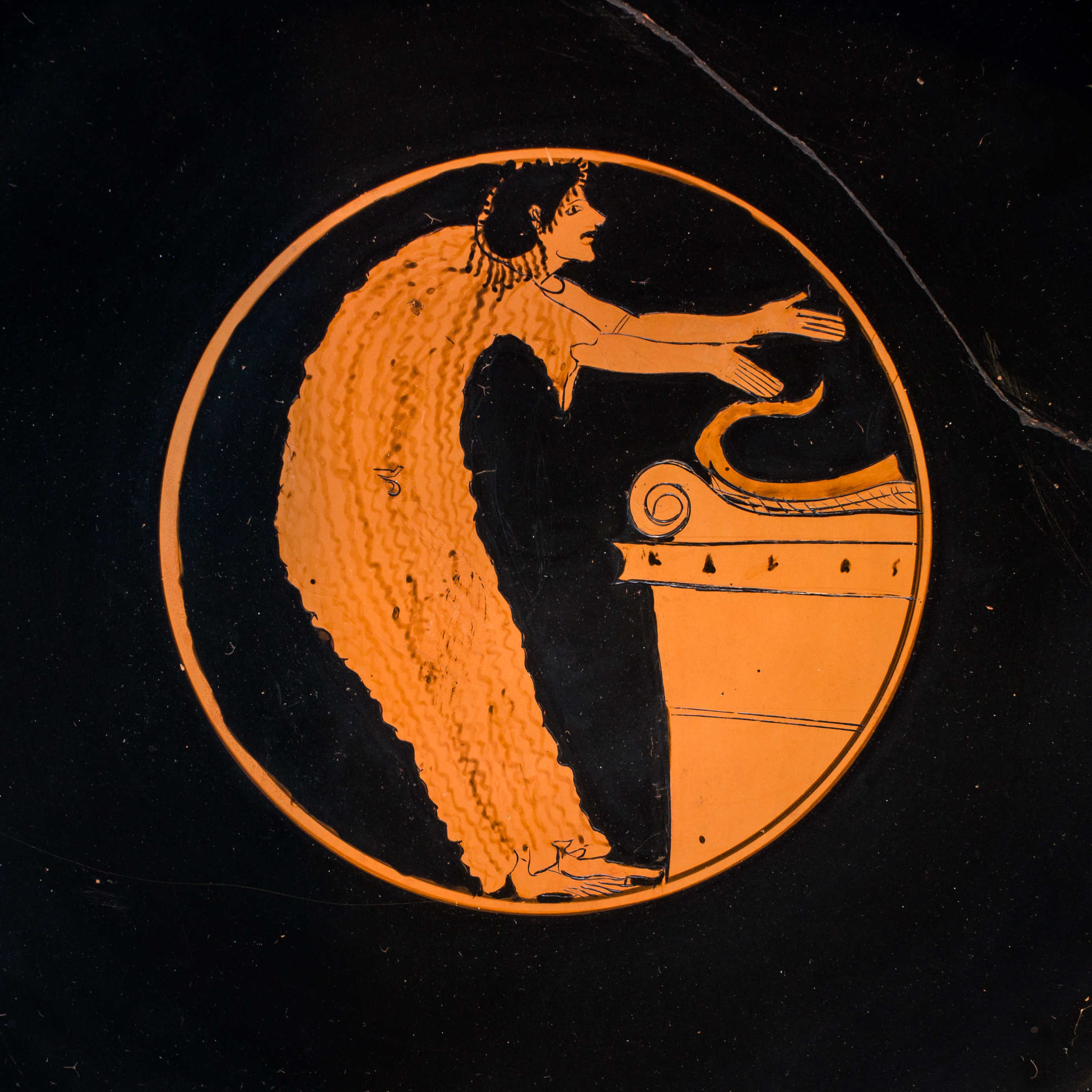
Red-figure kylix of a possible scene from the Oschophoria, ca. 510 BCE, currently held in the Archaeological Museum of Vulci, Vulci.

The Oschophoria (Greek: ὀσχοφόρια or ὠσχοφόρια) were a set of ancient Greek festival rites held in Athens during the month Pyanepsion (autumn) in honor of Dionysus, the god of the vine. The festival may have had both agricultural and initiatory functions. Amidst much singing of special songs, two young men dressed in women's clothes would bear branches with grape-clusters attached (ὠσχοί) from Dionysus to the sanctuary of Athena Skiras, and a footrace followed in which select ephebes competed. Ancient sources connect the festival and its rituals to the Athenian hero-king Theseus and specifically to his return from his Cretan adventure. According to that myth, the Cretan princess Ariadne, whom Theseus had abandoned on the island of Naxos while voyaging home, was rescued by an admiring Dionysus; thus the Oschophoria may have honored Ariadne as well. A section of the ancient calendar frieze incorporated into the Byzantine Panagia Gorgoepikoos church in Athens, corresponding to the month Pyanopsion (alternate spelling), has been identified as an illustration of this festival's procession.

== See also ==
- Athenian festivals
