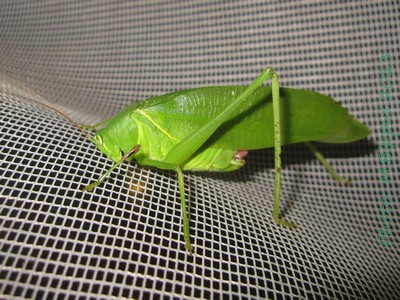

Scientific classification
- Kingdom: Animalia
- Phylum: Arthropoda
- Clade: Pancrustacea
- Class: Insecta
- Order: Orthoptera
- Suborder: Ensifera
- Family: Tettigoniidae
- Subfamily: Phaneropterinae
- Genus: Holochlora
- Species: H. biloba

Binomial name
- Holochlora biloba Stål, 1874

Synonyms
- Eremobia biloba Stål, 1875

= Holochlora biloba =

Species of cricket-like animal

Holochlora biloba is a species of bush crickets or katydids endemic to Madagascar and the Mascarene archipelago.
