= Paeon of Amathus =

Ancient Cypriot historian

Paeon of Amathus (Greek: Παίων ὁ Ἀμαθούσιος) was an early Hellenistic historian from Amathus on the Island of Cyprus, mentioned in the writings of Plutarch and the lexicographer Hesychius of Alexandria.

== Theseus and Ariadne ==
Plutarch recounts a story he attributes to Paeon concerning Theseus and Ariadne. Theseus and Ariadne were driven off course by a storm and onto the island of Cyprus. Theseus put Ariadne, who was pregnant and in great distress from the motion of the ship, ashore alone but was himself swept out to sea again. The Cyprian women cared for Ariadne, comforting her in her loneliness, giving letters to Ariadne, which they had written, saying the letters had come from Theseus. But Ariadne died in childbirth. When Theseus returned, greatly distraught, he gave the island money, asking them to make sacrifices to Ariadne, and had two small statuettes, one silver, one bronze, set up in her honor. According to Plutarch, Paeon says that at the sacrifices made in Ariadne's honor on the second day of the month Gorpiaes, a young man lies down and imitates the cries and gestures of a woman in the pains of labor and that they call the place where the sacrifices were held the grove of Ariadne Aphrodite.

== Bearded Aphrodite ==
Paeon of Amathus, quoted by Theophrastus, who said that the Cypriot goddess could take the shape of a man. Macrobius describes the statue of Venus in Cyprus as being bearded and having male genitals, but clad in female dress and holding a scepter. Aristophanes knew of the existence of this androgynous deity called Aphroditos. Hesychius confirmed that Aphroditos was a hermaphrodite.
