= Araethyrea =

Araethyrea (/ˌærəˈθɪriə/; Ancient Greek: Ἀραιθυρέα) was in Greek mythology a daughter of Aras, an autochthon who was believed to have built Arantea, the most ancient town in Phlius. She had a brother called Aoris, and is said to have been fond of the chase and warlike pursuits.

== Mythology ==
When Araethyrea died, her brother called the country of Phlius after her. She was the mother of Phlias. The monuments of Araethyrea and her brother, consisting of round pillars, were still extant in the time of Pausanias; and before the mysteries of Demeter were commenced at Phlius, the people always invoked Aras and his two children with their faces turned towards their monuments.
