= Bacchus and Ariadne (poem) =

Poem by Leigh Hunt

Bacchus and Ariadne is a poem by Leigh Hunt written and published in 1819. The result of three years of work, the poem tells the Greek myth of Hero and Leander, two lovers, and the story of their forlorn fate. Hunt began working on the poem during the summer of 1816, arousing the interest of the publisher John Taylor, and despite repeated delays to allow Hunt to deal with other commitments the poem was finished and published in a collection 1819. Hunt later claimed in a poem about Bacchus and Ariadne that he was seeking to humanise myths and make them more understandable to the common people. The collection was well received by contemporary critics and poets, including Thomas Carlyle, while more modern writers such as Edmund Blunden have criticised the flow of its narrative.

== Background ==
After the decline in circulation for his paper the Examiner following Napoleon's defeat at Waterloo, Hunt began to focus more on his poetry. During this time, he decided to write poems about the story of Bacchus and Ariadne along with the story of Hero and Leander. After starting on the poem about Hero and Leander during summer 1816, Hunt showed the lines to the publisher John Taylor who gave Hunt 20 guineas as a partial payment for a collection including the poem.

A notice by Taylor and Hessey was sent to Hunt on 22 February 1817 asking about Bacchus and Ariadne. Percy Bysshe Shelley responded for Hunt to gain more time for Hunt to complete the volume. In June, Hunt devoted his time to work on the second edition of The Story of the Remini while hoping to finish the collection during winter 1818. However, the projected date was pushed back by the end of 1818. By July 1819, the poem, along with Hero and Leander, The Panther were finished and soon published.

== Poem ==
The poem begins with Ariadne waking into a half-conscious state:

The moist and quiet morn was scarcely breaking.
When Ariadne in her bower was waking;
Her eyelids still were closing, and she heard
But indistinctly yet a little bird.
That in the leaves o'erhead, waiting the sun.
Seemed answering another distant one.
She wakes, but stirred not, only just to please
Her pillow-nestling cheek; while the full seas.
* * * * *
Her senses lingering in the feel of sleep;
And with a little smile she seemed to say,
'I know my love is near me, and 'tis day.'
At length, not feeling the accustomed arm.
That from all sense of fancied want and harm
Used to enclose her, when she turned that way.
She stretched her hand to feel where Theseus lay. (lines 1–8, 12–18)

When Ariadne realises that Theseus is not there, she immediately panics:

But how? Not there? She starts with a small cry,
And feels the empty space, and runs her eye
O'er all the bower, and stretches from the bed
One hasty foot, and listens with wild head.
No sight—no voice: she tries to smile, heart-sick.
And murmurs, 'Oh, 'tis but some hiding trick;
He sees me through the boughs:' and so she rose.
And, like a wood-nymph, through the glimmering goes.
And for a while delays to call his name,
Pretending she should spoil his amorous game;
But stops at last, her throat full-pulsed with fears.
And calls convulsively with bursting tears;
Then calls again; and then in the open air
Rushes, and fiercely calls. He is not there. (lines 22–35)

She faints as she realises that Theseus has deserted her in a reversal of the opening:

The faithless bark, far off, leaning away.
And now with gleaming sail, and now with dim.
Hastening to slip o'er the horizon's brim.
'Tis gone; and as a dead thing, down falls she.
In the great eye of morn, then breaking quietly. (lines 41–45)

This leads into a discussion of various possibilities for Theseus's leaving, with an emphasis that he left in the name of patriotism:

Some say that Theseus took this selfish flight
From common causes — a cloyed appetite;
Others, that having brought her sister there
As well, he turned his easy love to her;
And others, who are sure to quote Heaven's orders 50
For great men's crimes, though not for small disorders.
Pretend that Bacchus in the true old way,
A dream, advised him sternly not to stay.
But go and cut up nations limb by limb.
And leave the lady and the bower to him.
One tiling looks certain,—that the chief that day
Was not alone a skulking runaway.
But left the woman that believed his smile
To all the horrors of a desert isle. (lines 41–59)

The poem continues with Ariadne's lament over her fate and she expresses the terror that she feels:

'Oh, Theseus, Theseus!' then awhile she stopped,
And turned, and in her hand her poor face dropped,
Shaking her head, and cried, 'How could you go.
And leave me here to die, that loved you so!
I would not have left you, even for mirth.
Not in the best and safest place on earth;
Nor, had you been never so false a one, 90
Denied you this poor breast to lean upon;
Much less for loving too confidingly;
And yet, for nothing worse, have you left me;
Left me—left Ariadne, sleeping too
Fast by your side; and yet for you, for you,
She left her father, country, home, and all. (lines 84–96)

After Ariadne finds a crown that Theseus left before, the poem describes the arrival of Bacchus and his companions:

Suddenly from a wood his dancers rush.
Leaping like wines that from the bottle gush;
Bounding they come, and twirl, and thrust on high
Their thyrsuses, as they would rouse the sky;
And hurry here and there, in loosened bands,
And trill above their heads their cymballed hands:
Some, brawny males, that almost show from far
Their forceful arms, cloudy and muscular;
Some, smoother females, who have nevertheless
Strong limbs, and hands, to fling with and to press;
And shapes, which they can bend with heavenward glare.
And tortuous wrists, and backward streaming hair.
A troop of goat-foot shapes came trampling after. (lines 161–173)

Bacchus shows Ariadne that his love is able to mend the pain of Theseus's betrayal:

Bacchus took in his arms his bridal lass.
And gave and shared as much more happiness
Than Theseus, as a noble spirit's caress.
Full of sincerity, and mind, and heart.
Out-relishes mere fire and self-embittering art. (lines 339–343)

The poem concludes with a cheerful philosophy that is symbolised in the image of Ariadne's immortalised crown:

The grateful god took off from his love's hair
Her fervid crown; and with a leap i' the air,
As when a quoiter springs to his firm eye.
Whirled it in buzzing swiftness to the sky.
Starry already, and with heat within,
It fired as it flew up with that fierce spin.
And opening into grandeur, round and even.
Shook its immortal sparkles out of heaven.
* * * * *
The easy wear of inward gracefulness.
Beneath this star, this star, where'er she be.
Sits the accomplished female womanly:
Part of its light is round about her hair;
And should her gentle cheek be wet with care,
The tears shall be kissed off, as Ariadne's were. (lines 346–353, 361–366)

== Themes ==
In a poem to the 1832 version of the poems, Hunt uses verse to claim that he seeks to humanise myth to make it more understandable to the common person. While many of the other works written by Hunt during the time had political themes that expressed his feelings about the actions of the British government, Bacchus and Ariadne was toned down and contained a "sociability" that was mentioned in the preface of Hunt's Foliage. When placed into a sequence following Hero and Leander, the Bacchus and Ariadne is a consolation to the themes of the first. Bacchus is able to save Ariadne, whereas no one was able to save Hero.

Hunt relied on the story from Ovid's Heroides to base his poem, but Hunt describes an result to the story that Ovid leaves untold. A major connection between Hunt's and Ovid's version is that they begin at sunrise. Ovid uses the sunrise to show that Ariadne is aware that she is alone in a stark manner whereas Hunt tones down the moment to show that Ariadne is in a half-conscious state. This continues further into the plot, as Ovid describes Ariadne's distress over Theseus's absence in graceful manner whereas Hunt imitates a panicked state. For the rest of the story involving Bacchus, Hunt's version is related to Titian's painting of Bacchus and Ariadne. This is especially true of Hunt's descriptions of Bacchus's arrival, which is very similar to Titian's painting.

Hunt also differs from his sources in that he reproaches Theseus for his actions in the name of patriotism and religion. Hunt also claims that Theseus's abandonment of Ariadne was merely ploy that is similar to how modern governments use the same excuse for their misdeeds.

== Critical response ==
The collection containing Bacchus and Ariadne was well received by contemporary critics with the London Magazine devoted a lengthy analysis to the works. Thomas Carlyle, Hunt's contemporary, in the poem "Ode to a Friend", praised Hunt and emphasised Bacchus and Ariadne in the description.

In 1930, Edmund Blunden claimed that the poem was an "unequally written narrative". Rodney Edgecombe, in 1994, claimed, "Hunt did well to choose Bacchus and Ariadne for his next poem, for the simple reason that the subject itself is comparatively static and makes few demands for that narrative upkeep, that exigency of plot by which Hunt sometimes appears to be embarrassed."
