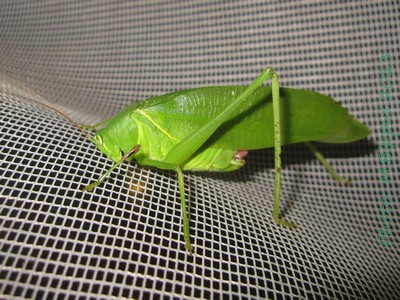
- Holochlora biloba

Scientific classification
- Kingdom: Animalia
- Phylum: Arthropoda
- Clade: Pancrustacea
- Class: Insecta
- Order: Orthoptera
- Suborder: Ensifera
- Family: Tettigoniidae
- Subfamily: Phaneropterinae
- Tribe: Holochlorini
- Genus: Holochlora; Stål, 1873

Type species
- Holochlora venosa Stål, 1873

= Holochlora =

Genus of cricket-like animals

Holochlora is a genus of bush-crickets in the subfamily Phaneropterinae. They occur in Africa (Mozambique and Madagascar) and Asia (widespread from India to Malesia).

== Species ==
Species include:

- Holochlora albida Brunner von Wattenwyl, 1878
- Holochlora allovenosa Liu, Liu & Kang, 2008
- Holochlora annulicornis Karny, 1926
- Holochlora astyla Karny, 1926
- Holochlora biloba Stål, 1874
- Holochlora bilobata Karny, 1926
- Holochlora brevifissa Brunner von Wattenwyl, 1878
- Holochlora celebica Brunner von Wattenwyl, 1878
- Holochlora cephalica Liu, Liu & Kang, 2008
- Holochlora cuisinieri Carl, 1914
- Holochlora curvicerca Ingrisch & Shishodia, 2000
- Holochlora digitata Karny, 1926
- Holochlora ebneri Karny, 1926
- Holochlora emarginata Brunner von Wattenwyl, 1878
- Holochlora forstenii Haan, 1842
- Holochlora fracticerca Karny, 1923
- Holochlora fruhstorferi Carl, 1914
- Holochlora gaida Ingrisch, 1987
- Holochlora geniculata Brunner von Wattenwyl, 1893
- Holochlora globosolaminata Karny, 1926
- Holochlora hebardi Karny, 1926
- Holochlora indica Kirby, 1906
- Holochlora japonica Brunner von Wattenwyl, 1878
- Holochlora javanica Brunner von Wattenwyl, 1878
- Holochlora lancangensis Liu, Zheng & Xi, 1991
- Holochlora longiloba Ingrisch & Shishodia, 2000
- Holochlora magna Xia & Liu, 1990
- Holochlora malayica Karny, 1926
- Holochlora mapanensis Karny, 1931
- Holochlora marginata Brunner von Wattenwyl, 1891
- Holochlora maxima Hebard, 1922
- Holochlora metazonalis Karny, 1931
- Holochlora mindanao Hebard, 1922
- Holochlora minor Liu, Liu & Kang, 2008
- Holochlora nigrospinulosa Brunner von Wattenwyl, 1893
- Holochlora nigrotympana Ingrisch, 1990
- Holochlora obtusa Brunner von Wattenwyl, 1878
- Holochlora paradoxa Karny, 1926
- Holochlora praetermissa Brunner von Wattenwyl, 1891
- Holochlora prasina Rehn, 1909
- Holochlora pygmaea Karny, 1926
- Holochlora sarasini Karny, 1931
- Holochlora signata Brunner von Wattenwyl, 1891
- Holochlora spectabilis Walker, 1869
- Holochlora staeli Krauss, 1904
- Holochlora sumatrensis Karny, 1927
- Holochlora sutteri Willemse, 1953
- Holochlora traba Ingrisch & Shishodia, 1998
- Holochlora tumescens Brunner von Wattenwyl, 1878
- Holochlora tumida Ingrisch & Shishodia, 1998
- Holochlora unciformis Liu, Liu & Kang, 2008
- Holochlora vanderrneermohri Ebner, 1934
- Holochlora venosa Stål, 1873
- Holochlora venusta Carl, 1914
