= Cissus (disambiguation) =

Cissus (from Greek kissos, ivy) may refer to:

== In Ancient Greece ==
- Cissus (Mygdonia) a town and mountain in Macedon
- Cissus (Cappadocia) a town in ancient Cappadocia, now in Turkey
- Cissus the messenger who announced to Alexander the flight of Harpalus
- Cissus, a figure in Greek mythology

== In Botany ==
- Cissus a genus of woody Climbers (Vitaceae)

== See also ==
- Kissos municipality of Thessaly
