= Onthyrius =

Satyr in Greek mythology

In Greek mythology, Onthyrius or Onthyrios (Ancient Greek: Ὀνθυρίου) was the satyr who joined the army of Dionysus in his campaign against India. He was struck on his brow by Tectaphus with a pitiless blade.
