= Pylaieus =

Satyr

In Greek mythology, Pylaieus (Ancient Greek: Πυλαιέος) was the "broilbreeder" satyr who joined the army of Dionysus in his campaign against India. Tectaphus shore a sword through his throat.
