= Pithos (mythology) =

In Greek mythology, Pithos (Ancient Greek: Πίθον means 'large wine-jar') was the "broadbreasted" satyr who joined the army of Dionysus in his campaign against India. He was destroyed by Tectaphus with a bare steel.
