= Tectamus =

Hero of ancient Greek mythology

Tectamus (/ˈtɛktəməs/; Ancient Greek: Τέκταμος, lit. 'craftsman', 'builder' or 'carpenter') was a king of Crete and hero of ancient Hellenic mythology. He was also called Tectaphus, Teutamus (Τεύταμος), Tectauus (Τεκταῦος) and Tectaeus (Τεκταῖος).

== Name ==
Joseph Vendryes had suggested that the name Teutamus, after the legendary Pelasgian founder, may contain the Proto-Indo-European root *teutéh_{a}- ('tribe, people'). Later scholars proposed a relation of Pelasgian Teutamus with similar names that appear in Italy in later times.

== Genealogy ==
Tectamus was the son of Dorus and grandson of Hellen. He married Cretheus’s daughter who gave birth to his son Asterion.

== Mythology ==
According to Diodorus Siculus, Tectamus invaded Crete together with a horde of Aeolian and Pelasgian settlers and became the island's king. It was the third of the tribes that migrated to Crete. According to another version, Tectamus was a chief of Dorians and Achaeans.

== In later Greek historiography ==
Historian Ctesias wrote of a king of "Assyrian" provenance named Teutamus, and this historical personage appears in an epic tale involving Memnon, son of Eos.
