= Gemon =

In Greek mythology, Gemon (Ancient Greek: Γέμων means 'load') was one of the leaders of the satyrs, who joined the army of Dionysus in his campaign against India.
