= Satyr =

Male nature spirit with horse or goat features found in Greek mythology

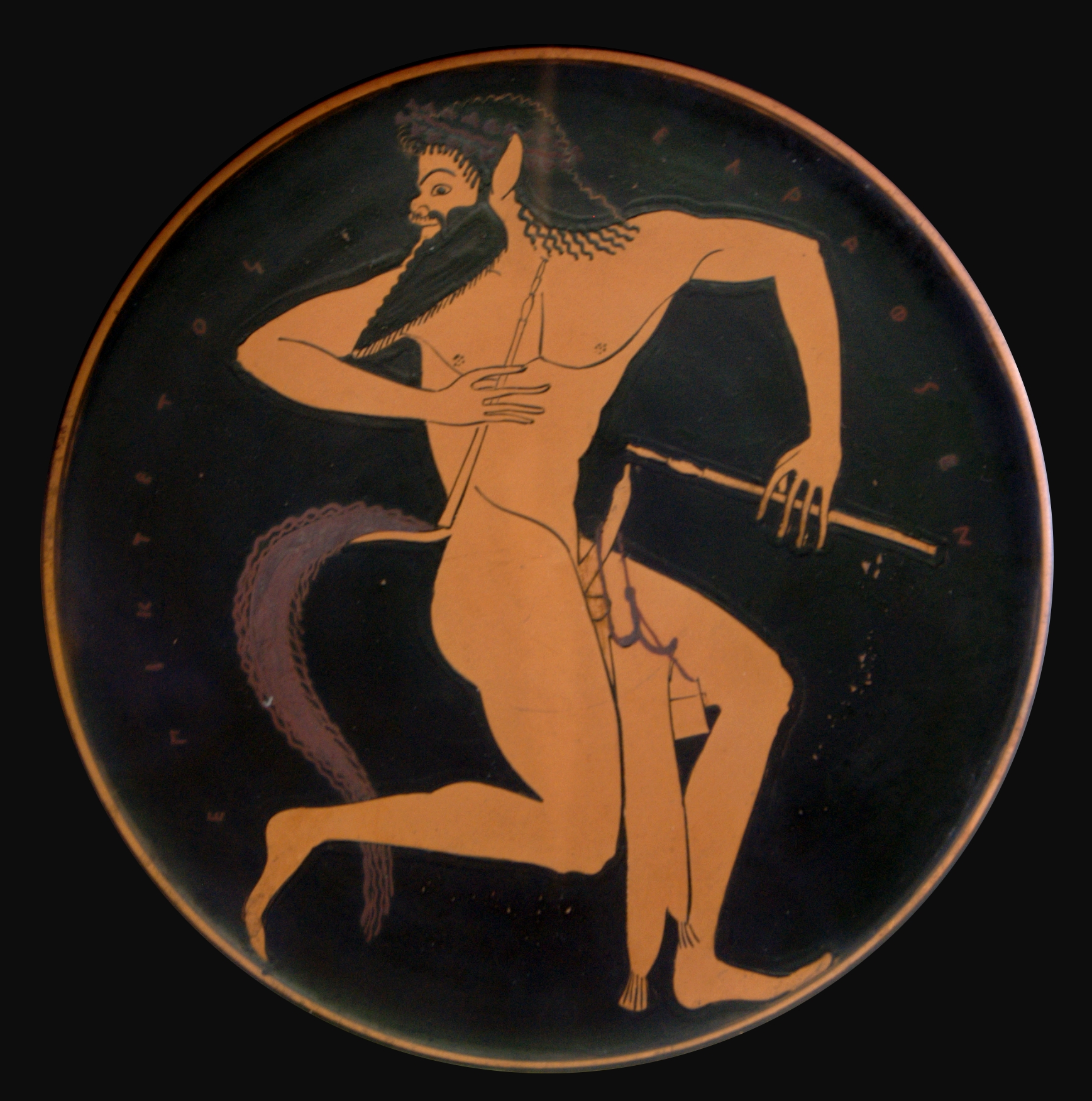
- Attic red-figure plate from Vulci, Etruria, dated c. 520–500 BC, showing an ithyphallic satyr holding an aulos, a kind of ancient Greek woodwind instrument

Creature information
- Other name: Faun Silenos
- Grouping: Legendary creature
- Sub grouping: Mythological hybrid Nature spirit

Origin
- Country: Greece

In Greek mythology, a satyr (Note: /ˈsætər/, US also /ˈseɪtər/.) (Ancient Greek: σάτυρος, romanized: sátyros, pronounced [sátyros]), also known as a silenus (Note: English: /saɪˈliːnəs/.) or silenos (Ancient Greek: σειληνός, romanized: seilēnós [seːlɛːnós]), and sileni (plural), is a male nature spirit with ears and a tail resembling those of a horse, as well as a permanent, exaggerated erection. Early artistic representations sometimes include horse-like legs, but, by the sixth century BC, they were more often represented with human legs. Comically hideous, they have mane-like hair, bestial faces, and snub noses and they always are shown naked. Satyrs were characterized by their ribaldry and were known as lovers of wine, music, dancing, and women. They were companions of the god Dionysus and were believed to inhabit remote locales, such as woodlands, mountains, and pastures. They often attempted to seduce or rape nymphs and mortal women alike, usually with little success. They are sometimes shown masturbating or engaging in bestiality.

In classical Athens, satyrs made up the chorus in a genre of play known as a "satyr play", which was a parody of tragedy and known for its bawdy and obscene humor. The only complete surviving play of this genre is Cyclops by Euripides, although a significant portion of Sophocles's Ichneutae has also survived. In mythology, the satyr Marsyas is said to have challenged the god Apollo to a musical contest and been flayed alive for his hubris. Although superficially ridiculous, satyrs were also thought to possess useful knowledge, if they could be coaxed into revealing it. The satyr Silenus was the tutor of the young Dionysus, and a story from Ionia told of a silenos who gave sound advice when captured.

Over the course of Greek history, satyrs gradually became portrayed as more human and less bestial. They also began to acquire goat-like characteristics in some depictions as a result of conflation with the Pans, plural forms of the god Pan with the legs and horns of goats. The Romans identified satyrs with their native nature spirits, fauns. Eventually the distinction between the two was lost entirely. Since the Renaissance, satyrs have been most often represented with the legs and horns of goats. Representations of satyrs cavorting with nymphs have been common in western art, with many famous artists creating works on the theme. Since the beginning of the twentieth century, satyrs have generally lost much of their characteristic obscenity, becoming more tame and domestic figures. They commonly appear in works of fantasy and children's literature, in which they are most often referred to as "fauns".

== Terminology ==
The etymology of the term satyr (Ancient Greek: σάτυρος, romanized: sátyros) is unclear, and several different etymologies have been proposed for it, including a possible Pre-Greek origin. Some scholars have linked the second part of name to the root of the Greek word θηρίον, thēríon, meaning 'wild animal'. This proposal may be supported by the fact that at one point Euripides refers to satyrs as theres. Another proposed etymology derives the name from an ancient Peloponnesian word meaning 'the full ones', alluding to their permanent state of sexual arousal. Eric Partridge suggested that the name may be related to the root sat-, meaning 'to sow', which has also been proposed as the root of the name of the Roman god Saturn. Satyrs are usually indistinguishable from sileni, whose iconography is virtually identical. According to Brewer's Dictionary of Phrase and Fable, the name 'satyr' is sometimes derogatorily applied to a "brutish or lustful man". The term satyriasis refers to a medical condition in males characterized by excessive sexual desire. It is the male equivalent of nymphomania.

== Origin hypotheses ==
=== Indo-European ===
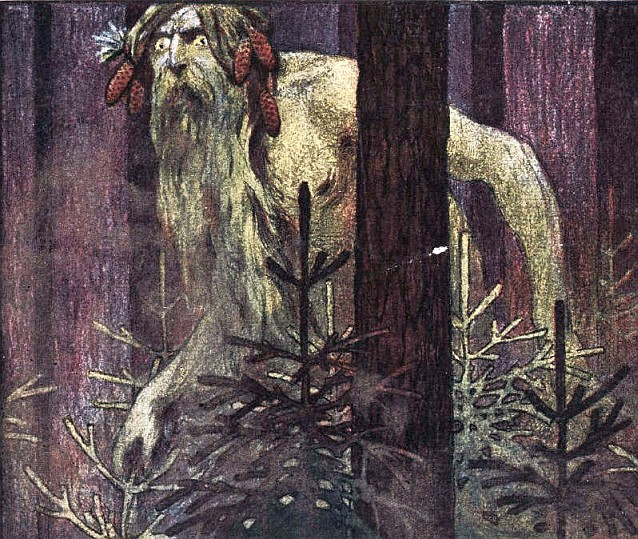
According to M. L. West, satyrs bear similarities to figures in other Indo-European mythologies, such as the Slavic leshy (pictured) and some form of similar entity probably originated in Proto-Indo-European mythology.

According to classicist Martin Litchfield West, satyrs and silenoi in Greek mythology are similar to a number of other entities appearing in other Indo-European mythologies, indicating that they probably go back, in some vague form, to Proto-Indo-European mythology. Like satyrs, these other Indo-European nature spirits are often human-animal hybrids, frequently bearing specifically equine or asinine features. Human-animal hybrids known as Kiṃpuruṣas or Kiṃnaras are mentioned in the Rāmāyaṇa, an Indian epic poem written in Sanskrit. According to Augustine of Hippo (354–430 AD) and others, the ancient Celts believed in dusii, which were hairy demons believed to occasionally take human form and seduce mortal women. Later figures in Celtic folklore, including the Irish bocánach, the Scottish ùruisg and glaistig, and the Manx goayr heddagh, are part human and part goat. The lexicographer Hesychius of Alexandria (fifth or sixth century AD) records that the Illyrians believed in satyr-like creatures called Deuadai. The Slavic leshy also bears similarities to satyrs, since he is described as being covered in hair and having "goat's horns, ears, feet, and long clawlike fingernails."

Like satyrs, these similar creatures in other Indo-European mythologies are often also tricksters, mischief-makers, and dancers. The leshy was believed to trick travelers into losing their way. The Armenian Pay(n) were a group of male spirits said to dance in the woods. In Germanic mythology, elves were also said to dance in woodland clearings and leave behind fairy rings. They were also thought to play pranks, steal horses, tie knots in people's hair, and steal children and replace them with changelings. West notes that satyrs, elves, and other nature spirits of this variety are a "motley crew" and that it is difficult to reconstruct a prototype behind them. Nonetheless, he concludes that "we can recognize recurrent traits" and that they can probably be traced back to the Proto-Indo-Europeans in some form.

=== Near Eastern ===
On the other hand, a number of commentators have noted that satyrs are also similar to beings in the beliefs of ancient Near Eastern cultures. Various demons of the desert are mentioned in ancient Near Eastern texts, although the iconography of these beings is poorly-attested. Beings possibly similar to satyrs called śě'îrîm are mentioned several times in the Hebrew Bible. Śĕ'îr was the standard Hebrew word for 'he-goat', but it could also apparently sometimes refer to demons in the forms of goats. They were evidently subjects of veneration, because Leviticus 17:7 forbids Israelites from making sacrificial offerings to them and 2 Chronicles 11:15 mentions that a special cult was established for the śě'îrîm of Jeroboam I. Like satyrs, they were associated with desolate places and with some variety of dancing. Isaiah 13:21 predicts, in Karen L. Edwards's translation: "But wild animals [ziim] will lie down there, and its houses will be full of howling creatures [ohim]; there ostriches will live, and there goat-demons [śĕ'îr] will dance." Similarly, Isaiah 34:14 declares: "Wildcats [ziim] shall meet with hyenas [iim], goat-demons [śĕ'îr] shall call to each other; there too Lilith [lilit] shall repose and find a place to rest." Śě'îrîm were understood by at least some ancient commentators to be goat-like demons of the wilderness. In the Latin Vulgate translation of the Old Testament, śĕ'îr is translated as pilosus, which also means 'hairy'. Jerome, the translator of the Vulgate, equated these figures with satyrs. Both satyrs and śě'îrîm have also been compared to the jinn of Pre-Islamic Arabia, who were envisioned as hairy demons in the forms of animals who could sometimes change into other forms, including human-like ones.

== In archaic and classical Greece ==
=== Physical appearance ===
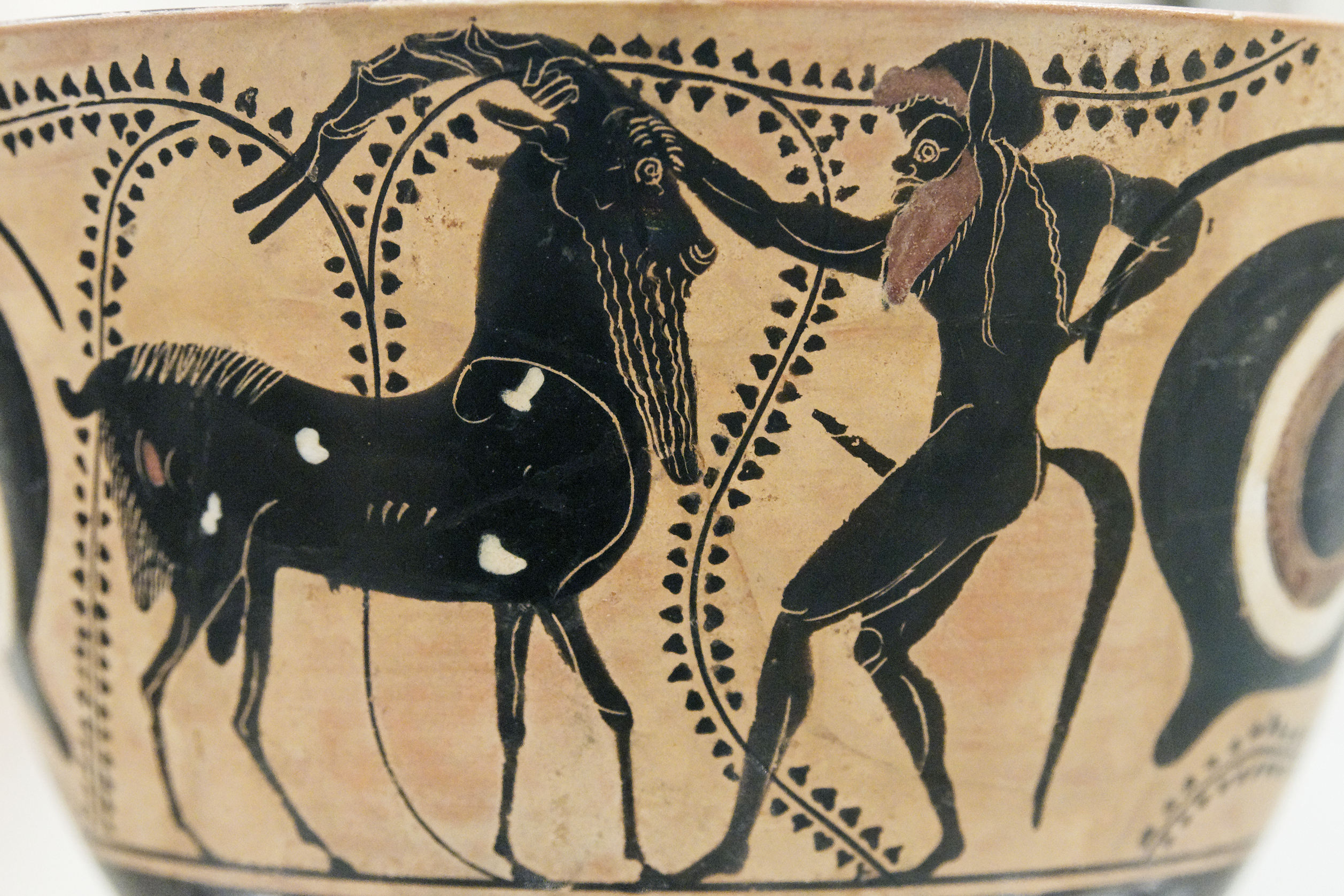
The goat on the left has a short goat tail, but the Greek satyr on the right has a long horse tail, not a goat tail (Attic ceramic, 520 BC).

In archaic and classical Greek art, satyrs are shown with the ears and tails of horses. They walk upright on two legs, like human beings. They are usually shown with bestial faces, snub noses, and manelike hair. They are often bearded and balding. Like other Greek nature spirits, satyrs are always depicted nude. Sometimes they also have the legs of horses, but, in ancient art, including both vase paintings and in sculptures, satyrs are most often represented with human legs and feet.

Satyrs' genitals are always depicted as either erect or at least extremely large. Their erect phalli represent their association with wine and women, which were the two major aspects of their god Dionysus's domain. In some cases, satyrs are portrayed as very human-like, lacking manes or tails. As time progressed, this became the general trend, with satyrs losing aspects of their original bestial appearance over the course of Greek history and gradually becoming more and more human. In the most common depictions, satyrs are shown drinking wine, dancing, playing flutes, chasing nymphs, or consorting with Dionysus. They are also frequently shown masturbating or copulating with animals. In scenes from ceramic paintings depicting satyrs engaging in orgies, satyrs standing by and watching are often shown masturbating.

=== Behavior ===
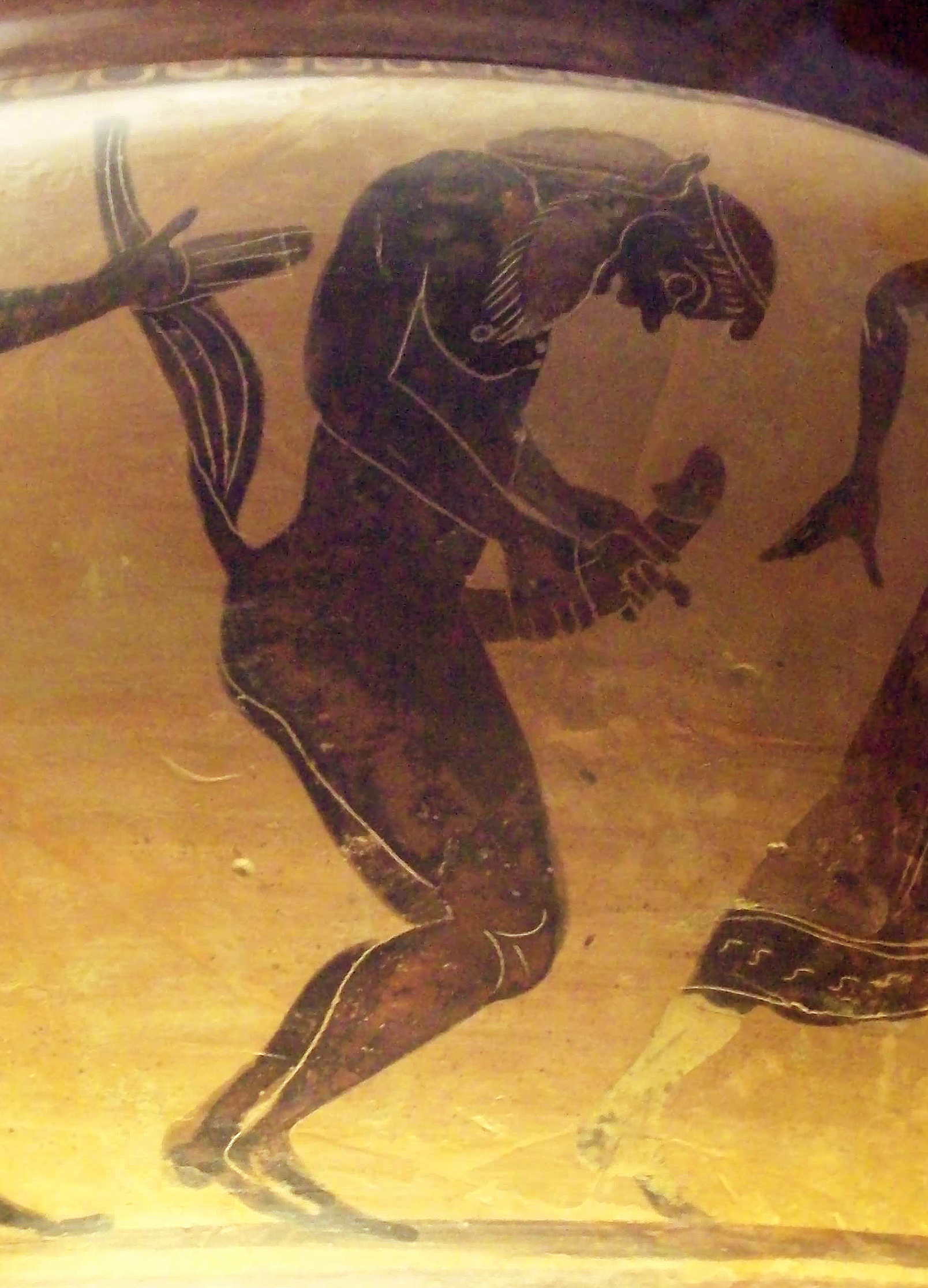
Detail of a krater, dating to c. 560–550 BC, showing a satyr masturbating. Athenian satyr plays were characterized as "a genre of 'hard-ons.'"

One of the earliest written sources for satyrs is the Catalogue of Women, which is attributed to the Boeotian poet Hesiod. Here satyrs are born alongside the nymphs and Kouretes and are described as "good-for-nothing, prankster Satyrs". Satyrs were widely seen as mischief-makers who routinely played tricks on people and interfered with their personal property. They had insatiable sexual appetites and often sought to seduce or ravish both nymphs and mortal women alike, though these attempts were not always successful. Satyrs almost always appear in artwork alongside female companions of some variety. These female companions may be clothed or nude, but the satyrs always treat them as mere sexual objects. A single elderly satyr named Silenus was believed to have been the tutor of Dionysus on Mount Nysa. After Dionysus grew to maturity, Silenus became one of his most devout followers, remaining perpetually drunk.

This image was reflected in the classical Athenian satyr play. Satyr plays were a genre of plays defined by the fact that their choruses were invariably made up of satyrs. These satyrs are always led by Silenus, who is their "father". According to Carl A. Shaw, the chorus of satyrs in a satyr play were "always trying to get a laugh with their animalistic, playfully rowdy, and, above all, sexual behavior." The satyrs play an important role in driving the plot of the production, without any of them actually being the lead role, which was always reserved for a god or tragic hero. Many satyr plays are named for the activity in which the chorus of satyrs engage during the production, such as Δικτυουλκοί, Diktyoulkoí, 'Net-Haulers', Θεωροὶ ἢ Ἰσθμιασταί, Theōroì ē Isthmiastaí, 'Spectators or Competitors at the Isthmian Games', and Ἰχνευταί, Ichneutaí, 'Searchers'. Like tragedies, but unlike comedies, satyr plays were set in the distant past and dealt with mythological subjects. The third or second-century BC philosopher Demetrius of Phalerum famously characterized the satiric genre in his treatise De Elocutione as the middle ground between tragedy and comedy: a "playful tragedy" (τραγῳδία παίζουσα, tragōdía paízdousa).

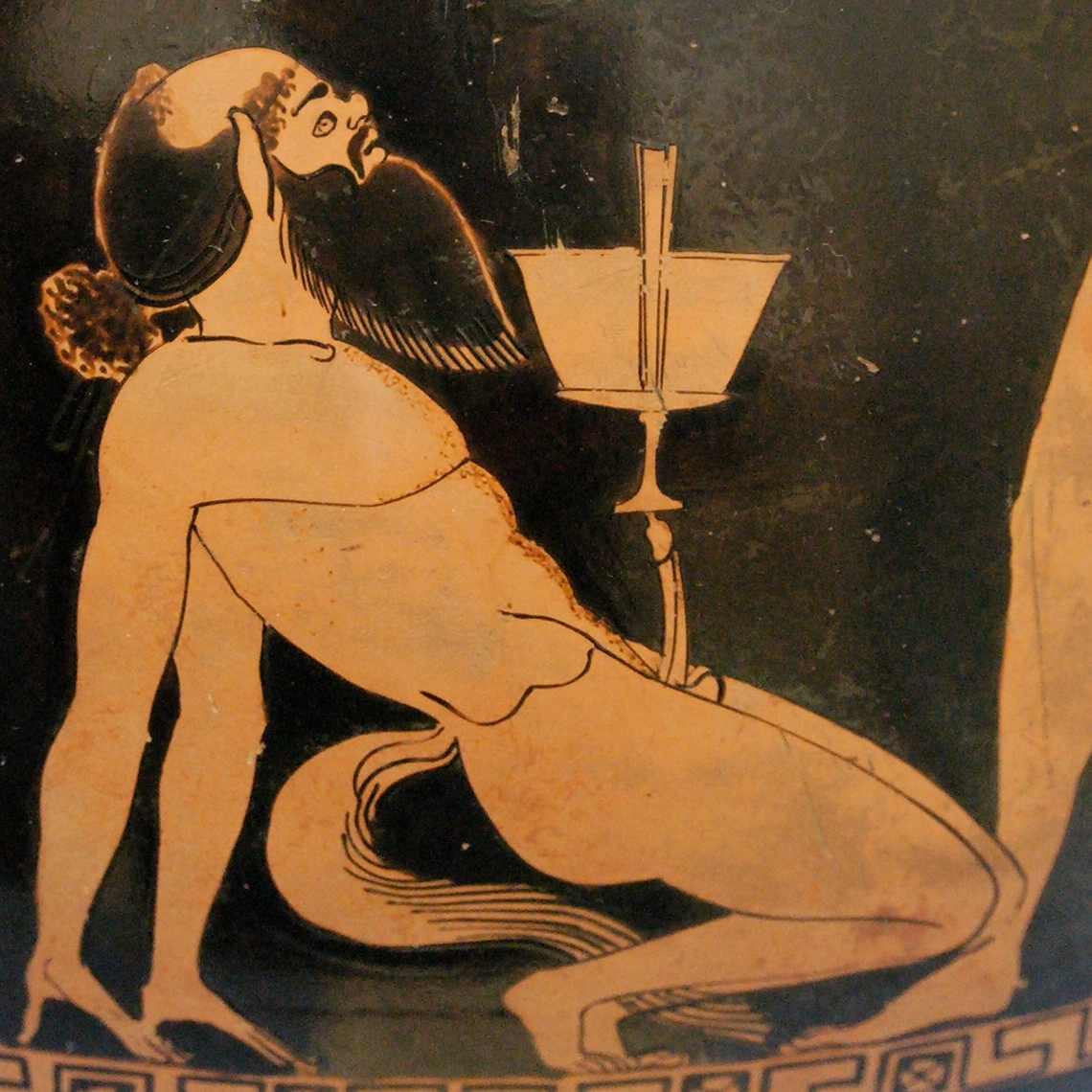
A bald, bearded, horse-tailed satyr balances a winecup on his penis, on an Attic red-figure psykter (c. 500–490 BC)

The only complete extant satyr play is Euripides's Cyclops, which is a burlesque of a scene from the eighth-century BC epic poem, the Odyssey, in which Odysseus is captured by the Cyclops Polyphemus in a cave. In the play, Polyphemus has captured a tribe of satyrs led by Silenus, who is described as their "Father", and forced them to work for him as his slaves. After Polyphemus captures Odysseus, Silenus attempts to play Odysseus and Polyphemus off each other for his own benefit, primarily by tricking them into giving him wine. As in the original scene, Odysseus manages to blind Polyphemus and escape. Approximately 450 lines, most of which are fragmentary, have survived of Sophocles's satyr play Ichneutae (Tracking Satyrs). In the surviving portion of the play, the chorus of satyrs are described as "lying on the ground like hedgehogs in a bush, or like a monkey bending over to fart at someone." The character Cyllene scolds them: "All you [satyrs] do you do for the sake of fun!... Cease to expand your smooth phallus with delight. You should not make silly jokes and chatter, so that the gods will make you shed tears to make me laugh."

In Dionysius I of Syracuse's fragmentary satyr play Limos (Starvation), Silenus attempts to give the hero Heracles an enema. A number of vase paintings depict scenes from satyr plays, including the Pronomos Vase, which depicts the entire cast of a victorious satyr play, dressed in costume, wearing shaggy leggings, erect phalli, and horse tails. The genre's reputation for crude humor is alluded to in other texts as well. In Aristophanes's comedy Thesmophoriazusae, the tragic poet Agathon declares that a dramatist must be able to adopt the personae of his characters in order to successfully portray them on stage. In lines 157–158, Euripides's unnamed relative retorts: "Well, let me know when you're writing satyr plays; I'll get behind you with my hard-on and show you how." This is the only extant reference to the genre of satyr plays from a work of ancient Greek comedy and, according to Shaw, it effectively characterizes satyr plays as "a genre of 'hard-ons.'"

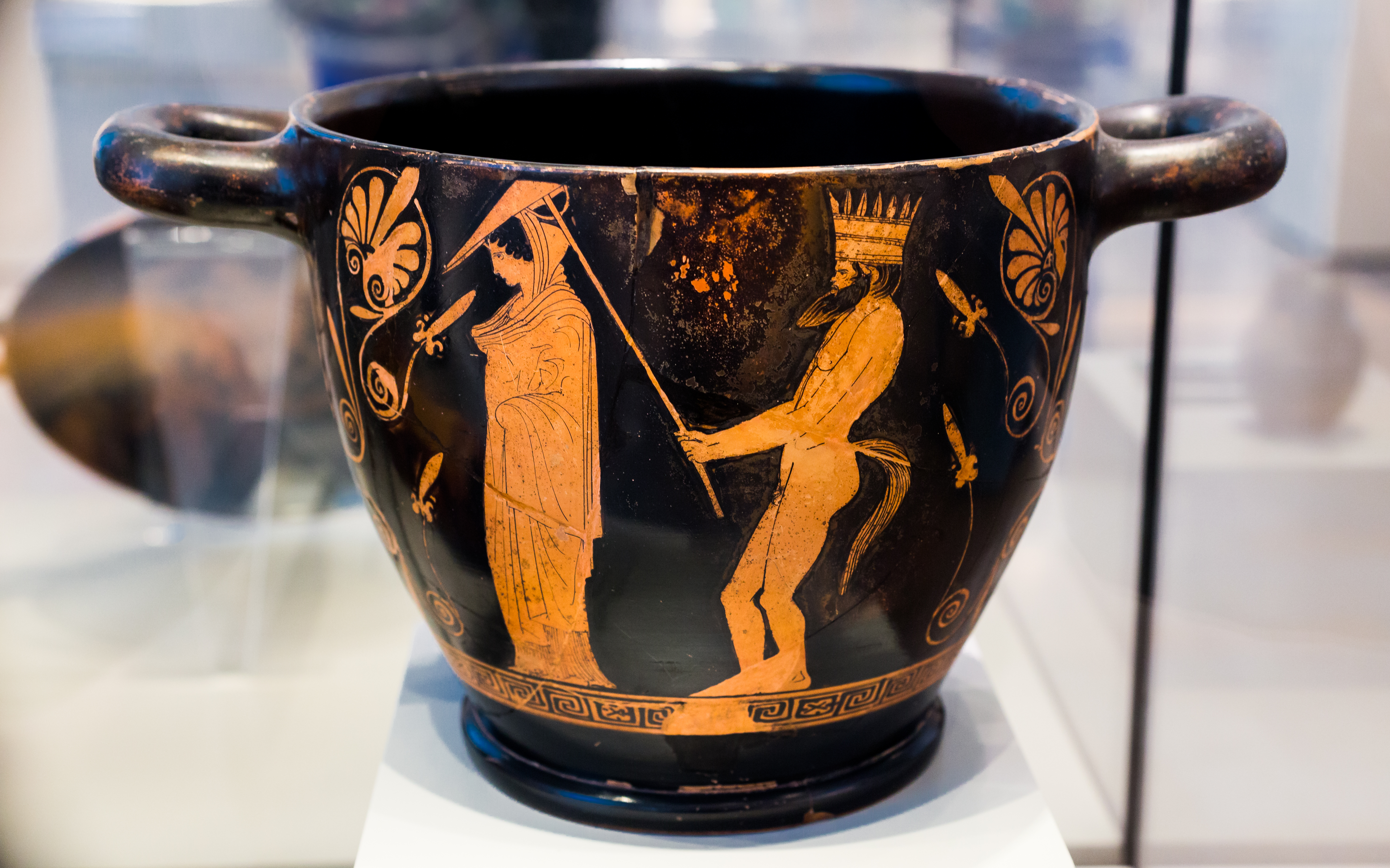
Satyr escorting the Basilinna (Queen), Attic red figure skyphos. c. 440 BC

In spite of their bawdy behavior, however, satyrs were still revered as semi-divine beings and companions of the god Dionysus. They were thought to possess their own kind of wisdom that was useful to humans if they could be convinced to share it. In Plato's Symposium, Alcibiades praises Socrates by comparing him to the famous satyr Marsyas. He resembles him physically, since he is balding and has a snub-nose, but Alcibiades contends that he resembles him mentally as well, because he is "insulting and abusive", in possession of irresistible charm, "erotically inclined to beautiful people", and "acts as if he knows nothing". Alcibiades concludes that Socrates's role as a philosopher is similar to that of the paternal satyr Silenus, because, at first, his questions seem ridiculous and laughable, but, upon closer inspection, they are revealed to be filled with much wisdom. One story, mentioned by Herodotus in his Histories and in a fragment by Aristotle, recounts that King Midas once captured a silenus, who provided him with wise philosophical advice.

=== Mythology ===
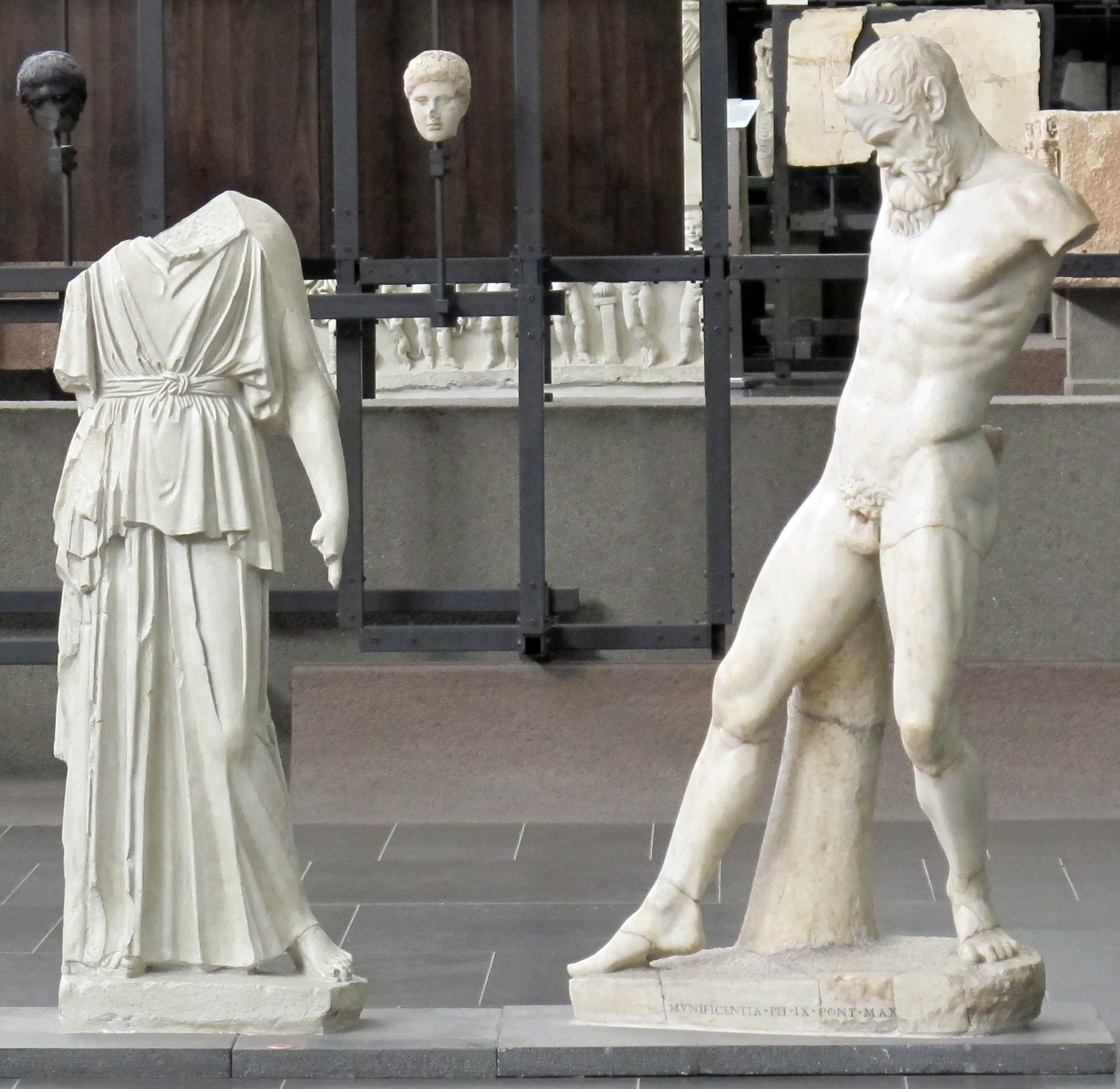
Roman marble copy of Myron's bronze sculptural group Athena and Marsyas, which was originally created around 440 BC

According to classicist William Hansen, although satyrs were popular in classical art, they rarely appear in surviving mythological accounts. Different classical sources present conflicting accounts of satyrs' origins. According to a fragment from the Hesiodic Catalogue of Women, satyrs are sons of the five granddaughters of Phoroneus and therefore siblings of the Oreads and the Kouretes. The satyr Marsyas, however, is described by mythographers as the son of either Olympos or Oiagros. Hansen observes that "there may be more than one way to produce a satyr, as there is to produce a Cyclops or a centaur." The classical Greeks recognized that satyrs obviously could not self-reproduce since there were no female satyrs, but they seem to have been unsure whether satyrs were mortal or immortal.

Rather than appearing en masse as in satyr-plays, when satyrs appear in myths it is usually in the form of a single, famous character. The comic playwright Melanippides of Melos (c. 480–430 BC) tells the story in his lost comedy Marsyas of how, after inventing the aulos, the goddess Athena looked in the mirror while she was playing it. She saw how blowing into it puffed up her cheeks and made her look silly, so she threw the aulos away and cursed it so that whoever picked it up would meet an awful death. The aulos was picked up by the satyr Marsyas, who challenged Apollo to a musical contest. They both agreed beforehand that whoever won would be allowed to do whatever he wanted to the loser. Marsyas played the aulos and Apollo played the lyre. Apollo turned his lyre upside-down and played it. He asked Marsyas to do the same with his instrument. Since he could not, Apollo was deemed to victor. Apollo hung Marsyas from a pine tree and flayed him alive to punish him for his hubris in daring to challenge one of the gods. Later, this story became accepted as canonical and the Athenian sculptor Myron created a group of bronze sculptures based on it, which was installed before the western front of the Parthenon in around 440 BC. Surviving retellings of the legend are found in the Library of Pseudo-Apollodorus, Pausanias's Guide to Greece, and the Fabulae of Pseudo-Hyginus.

In a myth referenced in multiple classical texts, including the Bibliotheke of Pseudo-Apollodorus and the Fabulae of Pseudo-Hyginus, a satyr from Argos once attempted to rape the nymph Amymone, but she called to the god Poseidon for help and he launched his trident at the satyr, knocking him to the ground. This myth may have originated from Aeschylus's lost satyr play Amymone. Scenes of one or more satyrs chasing Amymone became a common trope in Greek vase paintings starting in the late fifth century BC. One of the earliest depictions of the scene comes from a bell krater in the style of the Peleus Painter from Syracuse (PEM 10, pl. 155) and another from a bell krater in the style of the Dinos Painter from Vienna (DM 7).

According to one account, Satyrus was one of the many sons of Dionysus and the Bithynian nymph Nicaea, born after Dionysus tricked Nicaea into getting drunk and raped her as she lay unconscious.

=== List of Satyrs ===
Name	Text	Notes
Ampelus	Nonnus' Dionysiaca, Ovid	young lover of Dionysus/Bacchus, contested in footrunning and swimming, killed by Selene for challenging her, Dionysus turned him into a star or the grape vine.
Astraeus	Nonnus, Dionysiaca	son of Silenus and brother of Leneus and Maron; chief of the satyrs who came to join Dionysus in the Indian War
Babys	Plutarch, Moralia	brother of Marsyas, he challenged Apollo to a music contest and lost.
Cissus	Nonnus, Dionysiaca	turned into an ivy plant; contested in footrunning with Ampelus
Gemon	Nonnus, Dionysiaca	one of the leaders of the satyrs who joined the army of Dionysus in his campaign against India
Hypsicerus	Nonnus, Dionysiaca	one of the leaders of the satyrs who joined the army of Dionysus in his campaign against India; character is likely a fabrication of Nonnus' (name translates to "tall-horn")
Iobacchus	Nonnus, Dionysiaca	
Lamis	Nonnus, Dionysiaca	one of the leaders of the satyrs who joined the army of Dionysus in his campaign against India
Leneus	Nonnus, Dionysiaca	son of Silenus and brother of Astraeus and Maron; a satyr who contested in footrunning with Ampelus
Lenobius	Nonnus, Dionysiaca	one of the leaders of the satyrs who joined the army of Dionysus in his campaign against India
Lycon	Nonnus, Dionysiaca	one of the leaders of the satyrs who joined the army of Dionysus in his campaign against India
Lycus	Nonnus, Dionysiaca	son of Hermes and Iphthime, and brother of Pherespondus and Pronomus
Maron	Nonnus, Dionysiaca	son of Silenus and brother of Astraeus and Leneus; charioteer of Dionysus
Marsyas		[needs citation and text]
Napaeus	Nonnus, Dionysiaca	one of the leaders of the satyrs who joined the army of Dionysus in his campaign against India
Oestrus	Nonnus, Dionysiaca	one of the leaders of the satyrs who joined the army of Dionysus in his campaign against India
Onthyrius	Nonnus, Dionysiaca	killed by Tectaphus during the Indian War
Orestes	Nonnus, Dionysiaca	one of the leaders of the satyrs who joined the army of Dionysus in his campaign against India; character is likely a fabrication of Nonnus' (name translates to "mountain-dweller")
Petraeus	Nonnus, Dionysiaca	one of the leaders of the satyrs who joined the army of Dionysus in his campaign against India
Phereus	Nonnus, Dionysiaca	one of the leaders of the satyrs who joined the army of Dionysus in his campaign against India
Pherespondus	Nonnus, Dionysiaca	herald of Dionysus during the Indian War and son of Hermes and Iphthime, and brother of Lycus and Pronomous
Phlegraeus	Nonnus, Dionysiaca	one of the leaders of the satyrs who joined the army of Dionysus in his campaign against India
Pithos	Nonnus, Dionysiaca	another satyr killed by Tectaphus
Poemenius	Nonnus, Dionysiaca	one of the leaders of the satyrs who joined the army of Dionysus in his campaign against India; character is likely a fabrication of Nonnus' (name translates to "Pastoral")
Pronomus	Nonnus, Dionysiaca	son of Hermes and Iphthime, and brother of Lycus and Pherespondus
Pylaieus	Nonnus, Dionysiaca	another Satyr killed by Tectaphus
Scirtus	Nonnus, Dionysiaca	one of the leaders of the satyrs who joined the army of Dionysus in his campaign against India
Silenus		[multiple texts; still needs citations]
Thiasus	Nonnus, Dionysiaca	one of the leaders of the satyrs who joined the army of Dionysus in his campaign against India; character is likely a fabrication of Nonnus' (name translates to "cult-association")
Unnamed Satyr	Ovid, Fasti	father of Ampelus by a Nymph
Phales	Aristophanes, The Acharnians	A satyr personification of the phallus and associated with the Dionysian festivities. In the work The Acharnians of Aristophanes, is mentioned in a phallic hymn as Phales raped Thratta the slave of Strymodorus

Many names of the satyrs that appear in Nonnos' Dionysiaca are heavily assumed to have been coined by the author, and are nothing more than plot devices with no mythological significance. Four names listed in the epic, when translated, are merely adjectives associated to the character ("Pastoral", "Cult-association", "Tall-horn", and "Mountain-dweller"). The names of the satyrs according to various vase paintings were: Babacchos, Briacchos, Dithyrambos, Demon, Dromis, Echon, Hedyoinos ("Sweet Wine"), Hybris ("Insolence"), Hedymeles, ("Sweet Song"), Komos ("Revelry"), Kissos ("Ivy"), Molkos, Oinos, Oreimachos, Simos ("Snub-nose"), Terpon and Tyrbas ("Rout").

== Later antiquity ==
=== Hellenistic Era ===
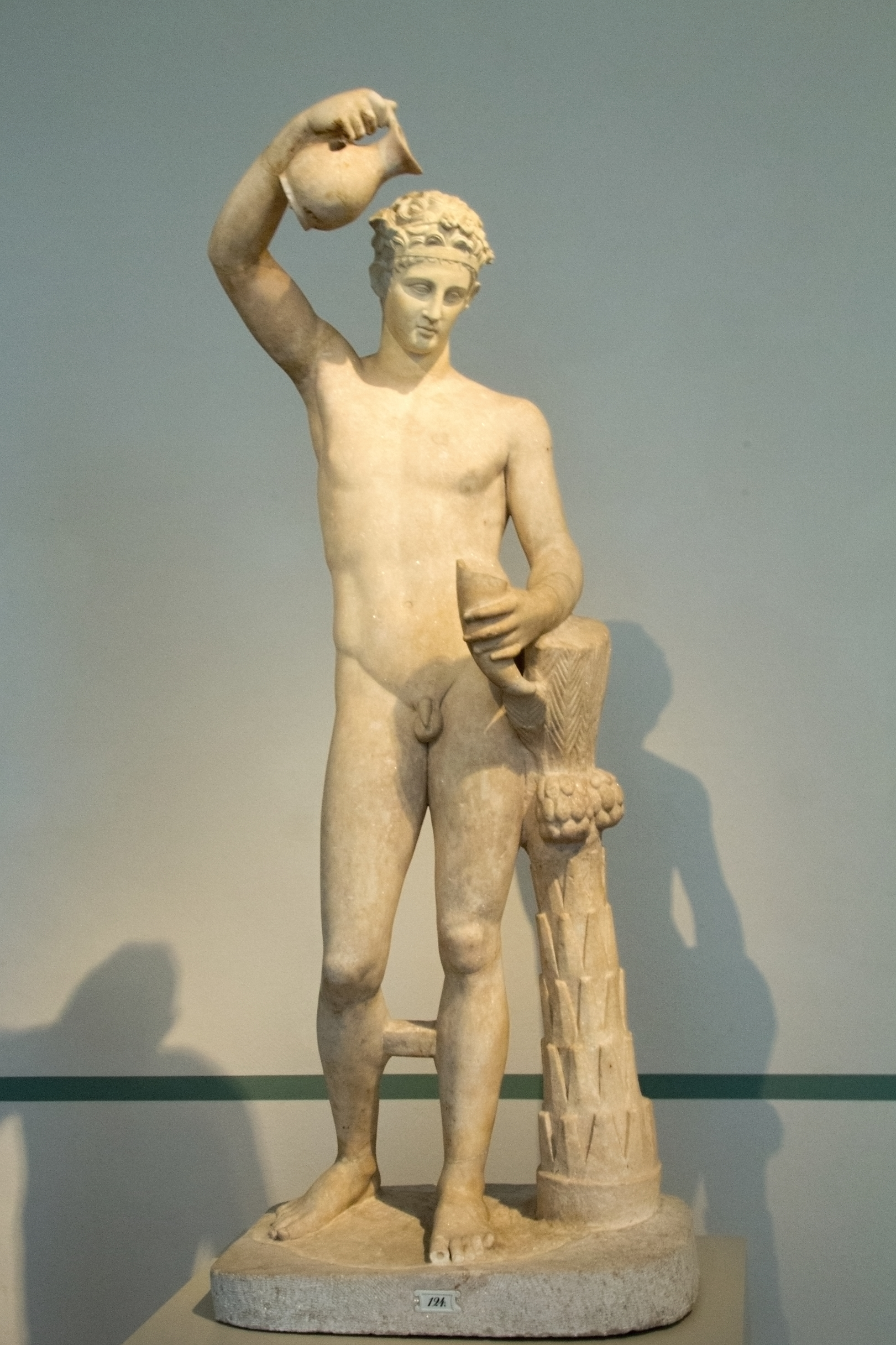
One of the supposed Roman marble copies of Praxiteles's Pouring Satyr, which represents a satyr as a young, handsome adolescent

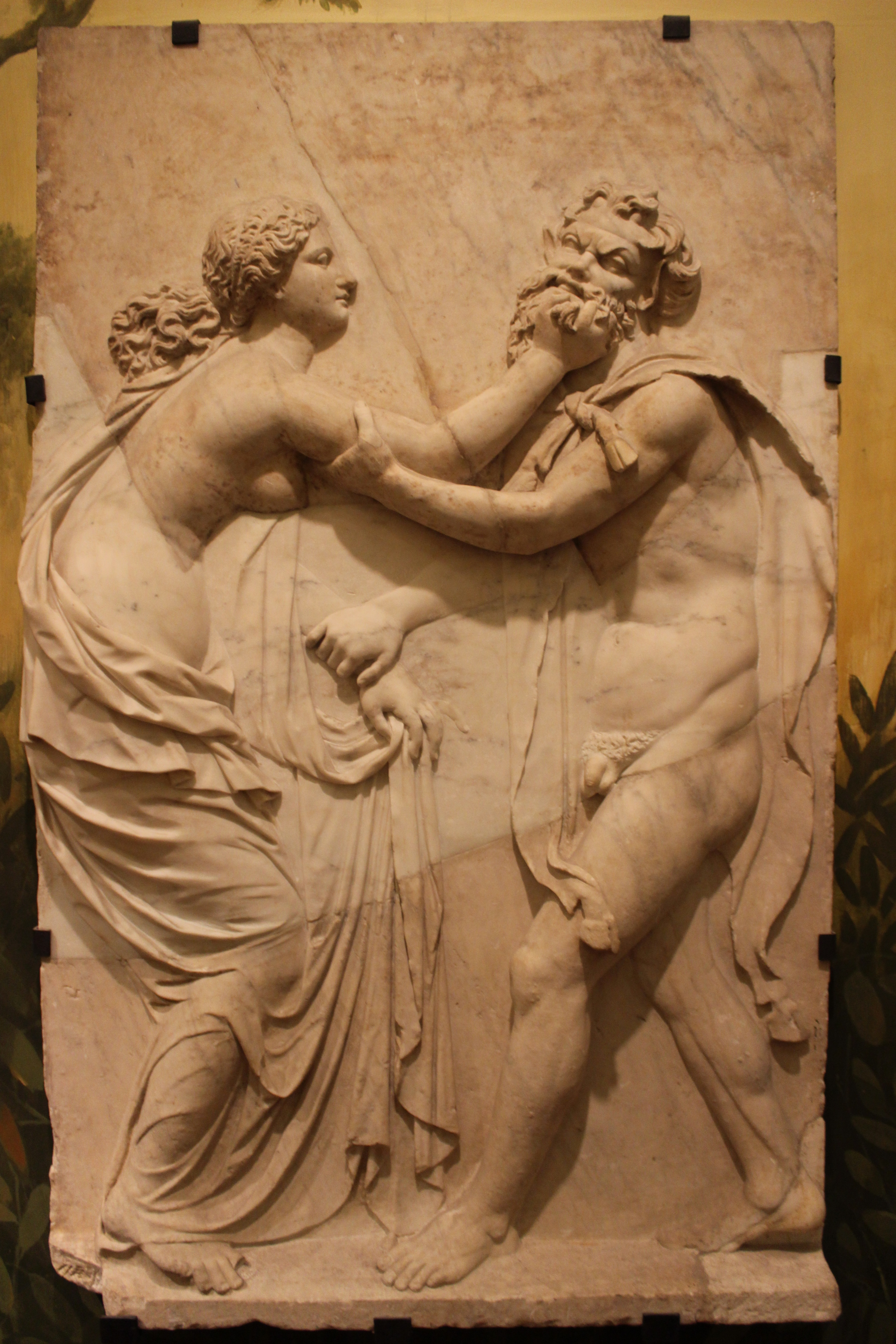
Ancient relief carving from the Naples National Archaeological Museum depicting a fight between a satyr and a nymph, a theme which became popular during the Hellenistic Era

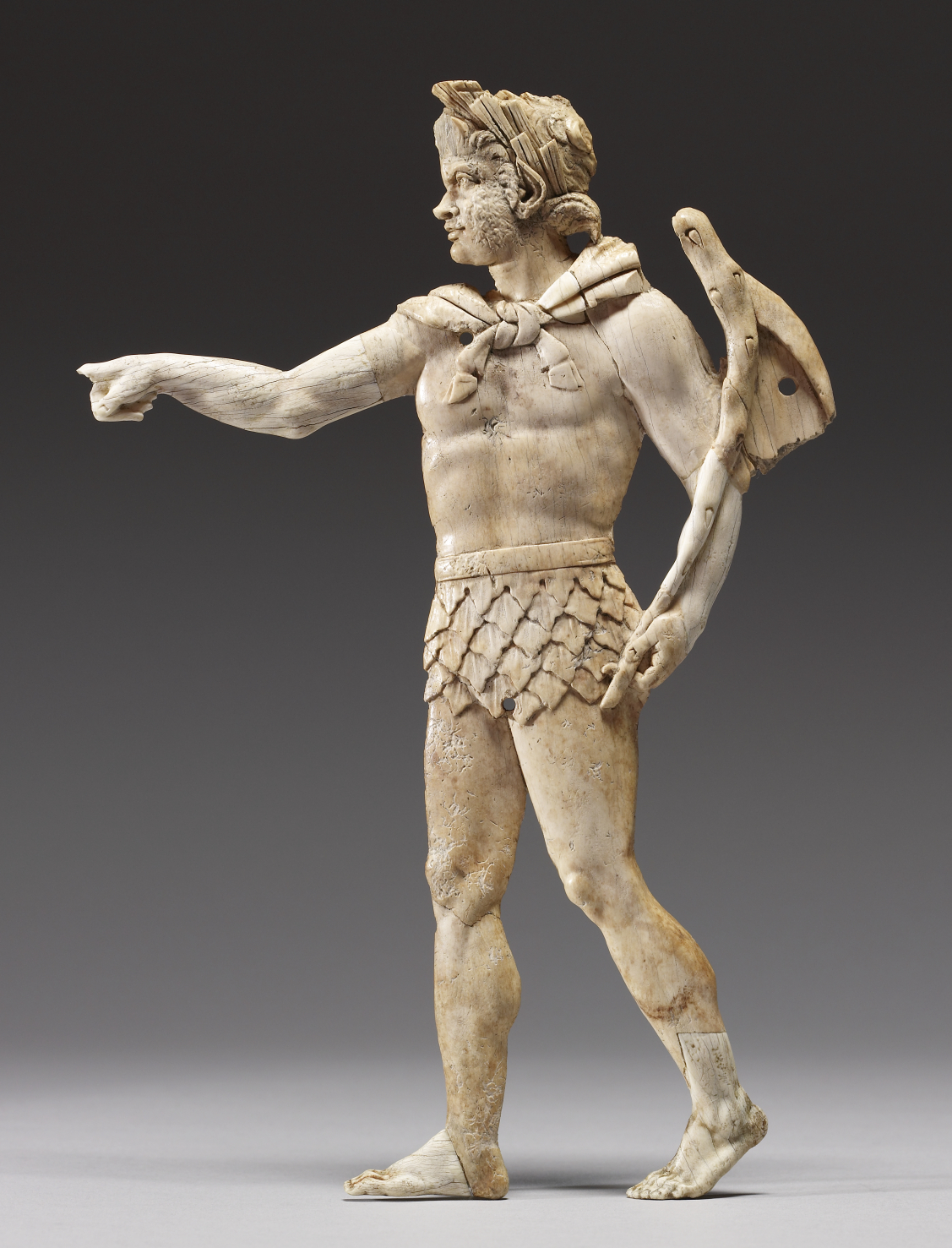
This Hellenistic satyr wears a rustic perizoma (loincloth) and carries a pedum (shepherd's crook). Walters Art Museum, Baltimore.

The iconography of satyrs was gradually conflated with that of the Pans, plural forms of the god Pan, who were regularly depicted with the legs and horns of a goat. By the Hellenistic Period (323–31 BC), satyrs were beginning to sometimes be shown with goat-like features. Meanwhile, both satyrs and Pans also continued to be shown as more human and less bestial. Scenes of satyrs and centaurs were very popular during the Hellenistic Period. They often appear dancing or playing the aulos. The maenads that often accompany satyrs in Archaic and Classical representations are often replaced in Hellenistic portrayals with wood nymphs.

Artists also began to widely represent scenes of nymphs repelling the unwanted advances of amorous satyrs. Scenes of this variety were used to express the dark, beastly side of human sexuality at a remove by attributing that sexuality to satyrs, who were part human and part animal. In this way, satyrs became vehicles of a metaphor for a phenomenon extending far beyond the original narrative purposes in which they had served during earlier periods of Greek history. Some variants on this theme represent a satyr being rebuffed by a hermaphrodite, who, from the satyr's perspective, appears to be a beautiful, young girl. These sculptures may have been intended as kind of sophisticated erotic joke.

The Athenian sculptor Praxiteles's statue Pouring Satyr represented the eponymous satyr as very human-like. The satyr was shown as very young, in line with Praxiteles's frequent agenda of representing deities and other figures as adolescents. This tendency is also attested in the descriptions of his sculptures of Dionysus and the Archer Eros written in the third or fourth century AD by the art critic Callistratus. The original statue is widely assumed to have depicted the satyr in the act of pouring an oinochoe over his head into a cup, probably a kantharos. Antonio Corso describes the satyr in this sculpture as a "gentle youth" and "a precious and gentle being" with "soft and velvety" skin. The only hints at his "feral nature" were his ears, which were slightly pointed, and his small tail.

The shape of the sculpture was an S-shape, shown in three-quarter view. The satyr had short, boyish locks, derived from those of earlier Greek athletic sculpture. Although the original statue has been lost, a representation of the pouring satyr appears in a late classical relief sculpture from Athens and twenty-nine alleged "copies" of the statue from the time of the Roman Empire have also survived. Olga Palagia and J. J. Pollitt argue that, although the Pouring Satyr is widely accepted as a genuine work of Praxiteles, it may not have been a single work at all and the supposed "copies" of it may merely be Roman sculptures repeating the traditional Greek motif of pouring wine at symposia.

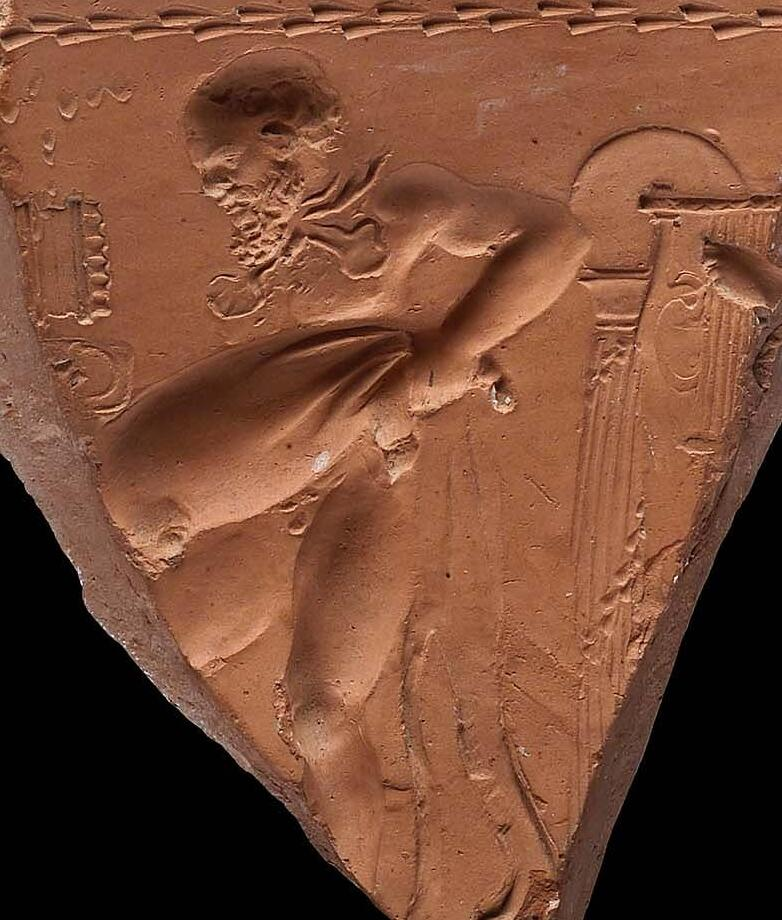
portion of bearded satyr, emptying a wine-skin, Ceramic, Arretine ware, Roman, Augustan Period 31 B.C.–A.D. 14

=== Ancient Rome ===
The Romans identified satyrs with their own nature spirits, fauns. Although generally similar to satyrs, fauns differed in that they were usually seen as "shy, woodland creatures" rather than the drunk and boisterous satyrs of the classical Greeks. Also, fauns generally lacked the association Greek satyrs had with secret wisdom. Unlike classical Greek satyrs, fauns were unambiguously goat-like; they had the upper bodies of men, but the legs, hooves, tail, and horns of goats. The first-century BC Roman poet Lucretius mentions in his lengthy poem De rerum natura that people of his time believed in "goat-legged" (capripedes) satyrs, along with nymphs who lived in the mountains and fauns who played rustic music on stringed instruments and pipes.

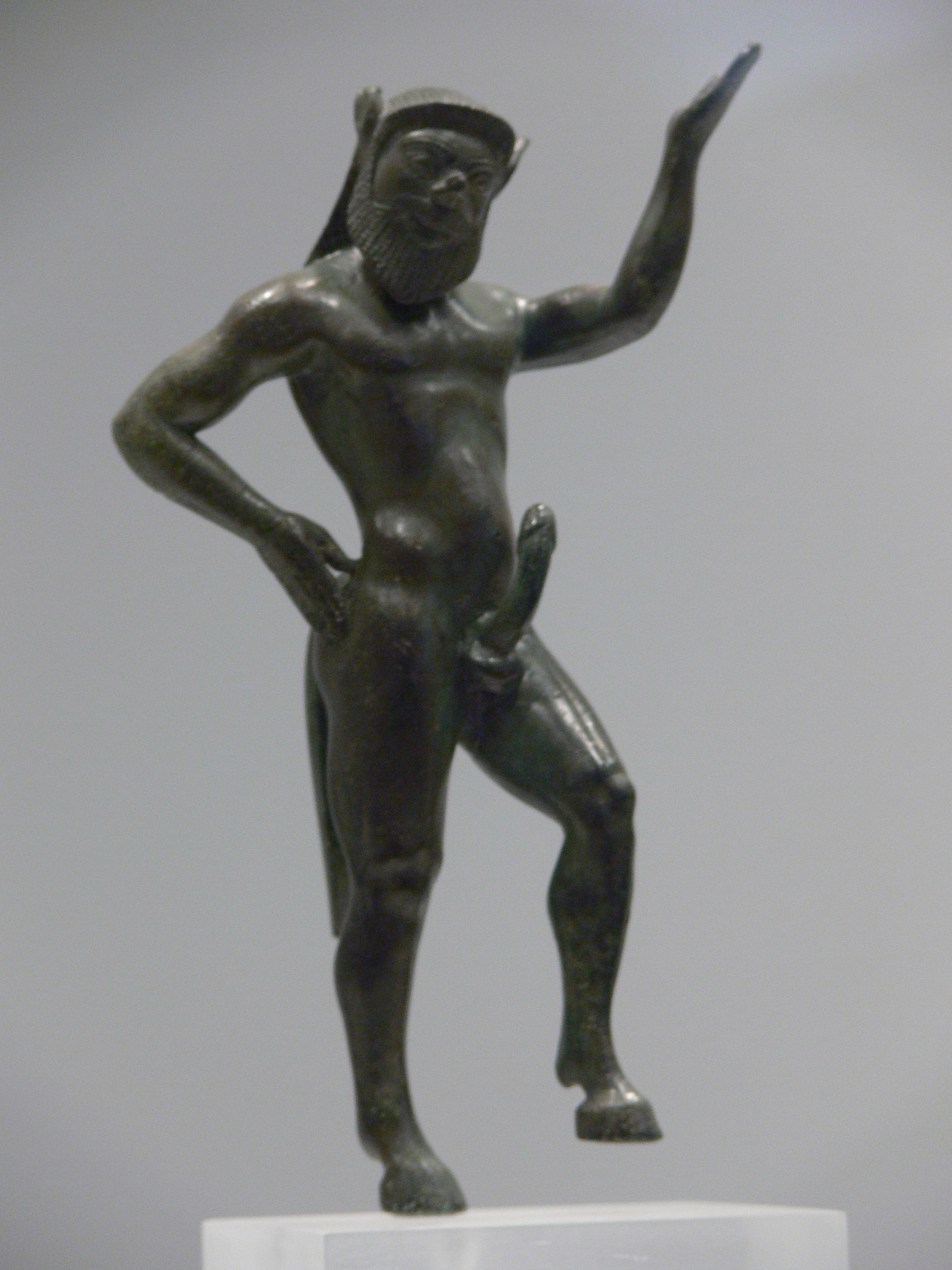
Statue of the satyr Silenus at Athens Archaeological Museum

In Roman-era depictions, satyrs and fauns are both often associated with music and depicted playing the Pan pipes or syrinx. The poet Virgil, who flourished during the early years of the Roman Empire, recounts a story in his sixth Eclogue about two boys who tied up the satyr Silenus while he was in a drunken stupor and forced him to sing them a song about the beginning of the universe. The first-century AD Roman poet Ovid makes Jupiter, the king of the gods, express worry that the viciousness of humans will leave fauns, nymphs, and satyrs without a place to live, so he gives them a home in the forests, woodlands, and mountains, where they will be safe. Ovid also retells the story of Marsyas's hubris. He describes a musical contest between Marsyas, playing the aulos, and the god Apollo, playing the lyre. Marsyas loses and Apollo flays him as punishment.

The Roman naturalist and encyclopedist Pliny the Elder conflated satyrs with gibbons, which he describes using the word satyrus, a Latinized form of the Greek satyros. He characterizes them as "a savage and wild people; distinct voice and speech they have none, but in steed thereof, they keep a horrible gnashing and hideous noise: rough they are and hairie all over their bodies, eies they have red like the houlets [owls] and toothed they be like dogs."

The second-century Greek Middle Platonist philosopher Plutarch records a legendary incident in his Life of Sulla, in which the soldiers of the Roman general Sulla are reported to have captured a satyr sleeping during a military campaign in Greece in 89 BC. Sulla's men brought the satyr to him and he attempted to interrogate it, but it spoke only in an unintelligible sound: a cross between the neighing of a horse and the bleating of a goat. The second-century Greek travel writer Pausanias reports having seen the tombs of deceased silenoi in Judaea and at Pergamon. Based on these sites, Pausanias concludes that silenoi must be mortal.

The third-century Greek biographer Philostratus records a legend in his Life of Apollonius of Tyana of how the ghost of an Aethiopian satyr was deeply enamored with the women from the local village and had killed two of them. Then, the philosopher Apollonius of Tyana set a trap for it with wine, knowing that, after drinking it, the ghost-satyr would fall asleep forever. The wine diminished from the container before the onlookers' eyes, but the ghost-satyr himself remained invisible. Once all the wine had vanished, the ghost-satyr fell asleep and never bothered the villagers again. Amira El-Zein notes similarities between this story and later Arabic accounts of jinn. The treatise Saturnalia by the fifth-century AD Roman poet Macrobius connects both the word satyr and the name Saturn to the Greek word for "penis". Macrobius explains that this is on account of satyrs' sexual lewdness. Macrobius also equates Dionysus and Apollo as the same deity and states that a festival in honor of Bacchus is held every year atop Mount Parnassus, at which many satyrs are often seen.

== After antiquity ==
=== Middle Ages ===
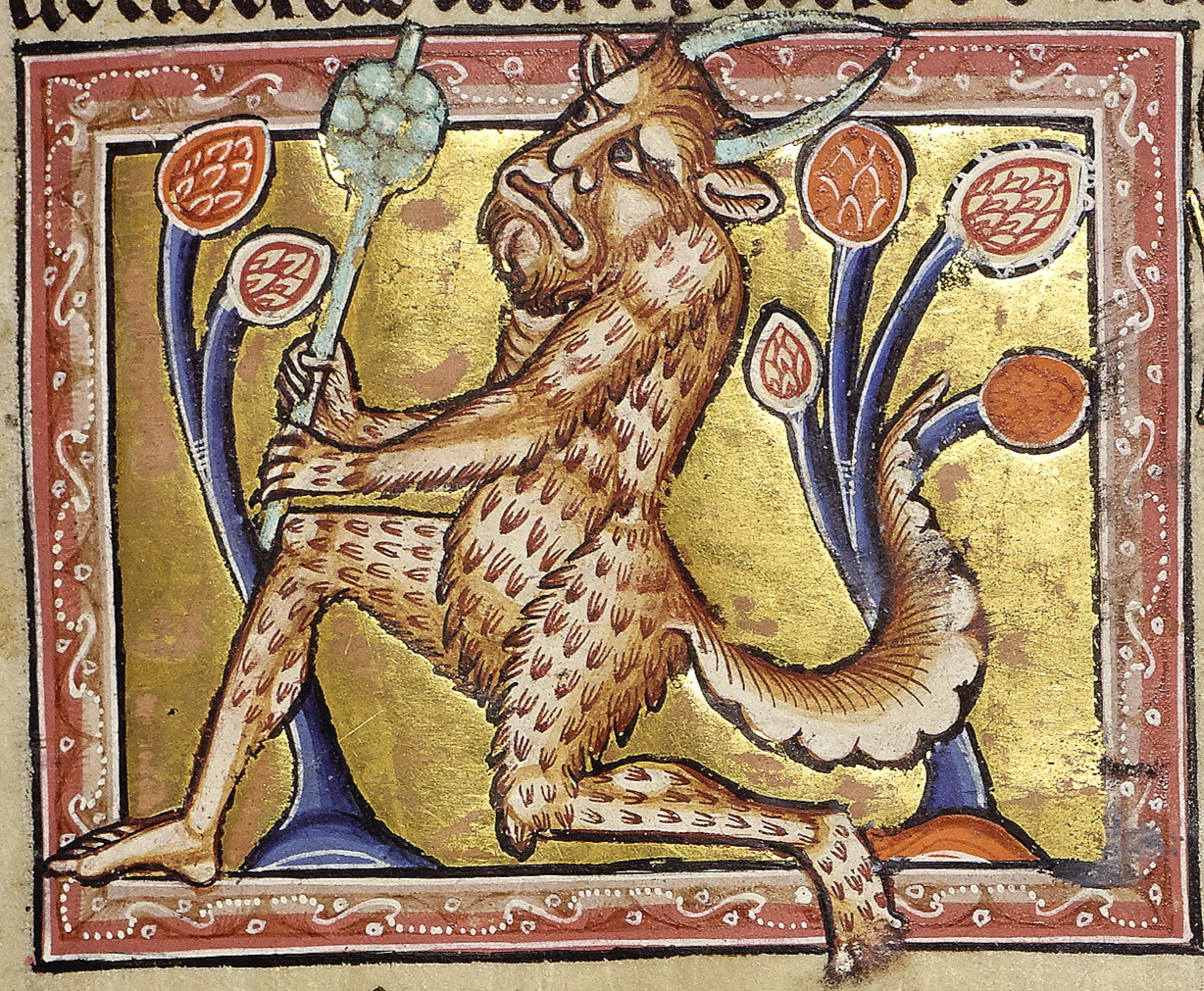
Medieval depiction of a satyr from the Aberdeen Bestiary, holding a wand resembling a jester's club. Medieval bestiaries conflated satyrs with western European wild men.

Starting in late antiquity, Christian writers began to portray satyrs and fauns as dark, evil, and demonic. Jerome (c. 347 – 420 AD) described them as symbols of Satan on account of their lasciviousness. Despite this, however, satyrs were sometimes clearly distinguished from demons and sometimes even portrayed as noble. Because Christians believed that the distinction between humans and animals was spiritual rather than physical, it was thought that even a satyr could attain salvation. Isidore of Seville (c. 560 – 636) records an anecdote later recounted in the Golden Legend, that Anthony the Great encountered a satyr in the desert who asked to pray with him to their common God. During the Early Middle Ages, features and characteristics of satyrs and the god Pan, who resembled a satyr, became absorbed into traditional Christian iconography of Satan.

Medieval storytellers in Western Europe also frequently conflated satyrs with wild men. Both satyrs and wild men were conceived as part human and part animal and both were believed to possess unrestrained sexual appetites. Stories of wild men during the Middle Ages often had an erotic tone and were primarily told orally by peasants, since the clergy officially disapproved of them. In this form, satyrs are sometimes described and represented in medieval bestiaries, where a satyr is often shown dressed in an animal skin, carrying a club and a serpent. In the Aberdeen Bestiary, the Ashmole Bestiary, and MS Harley 3244, a satyr is shown as a nude man holding a wand resembling a jester's club and leaning back, crossing his legs. Satyrs are sometimes juxtaposed with apes, which are characterized as "physically disgusting and akin to the Devil". In other cases, satyrs are usually shown nude, with enlarged phalli to emphasize their sexual nature. In the Second-Family Bestiary, the name "satyr" is used as the name of a species of ape, which is described as having a "very agreeable face, restless, however, in its twitching movements."

=== Renaissance ===
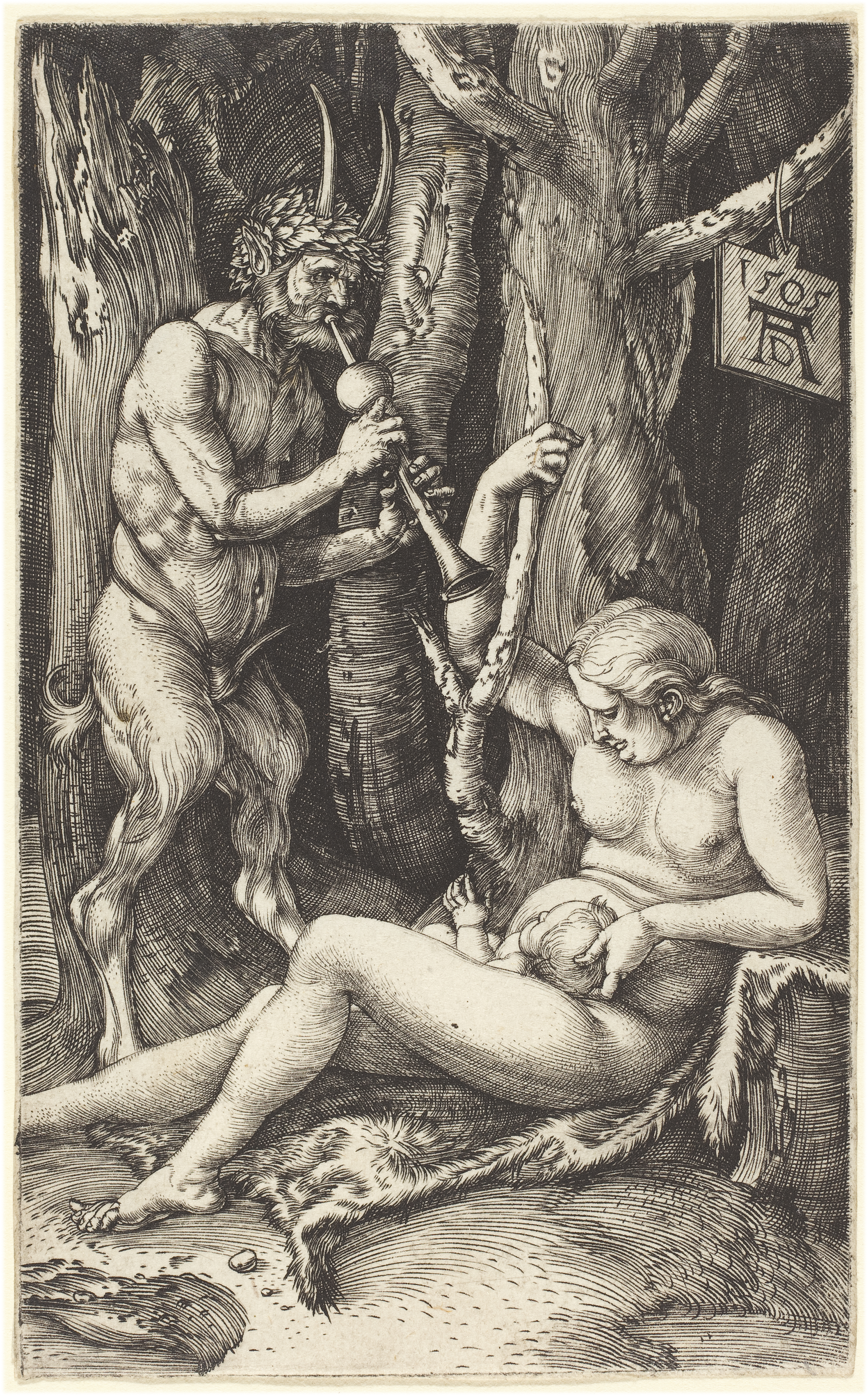
During the Renaissance, satyrs began to appear in domestic scenes, a trend exemplified by Albrecht Dürer's 1505 engraving The Satyr's Family.

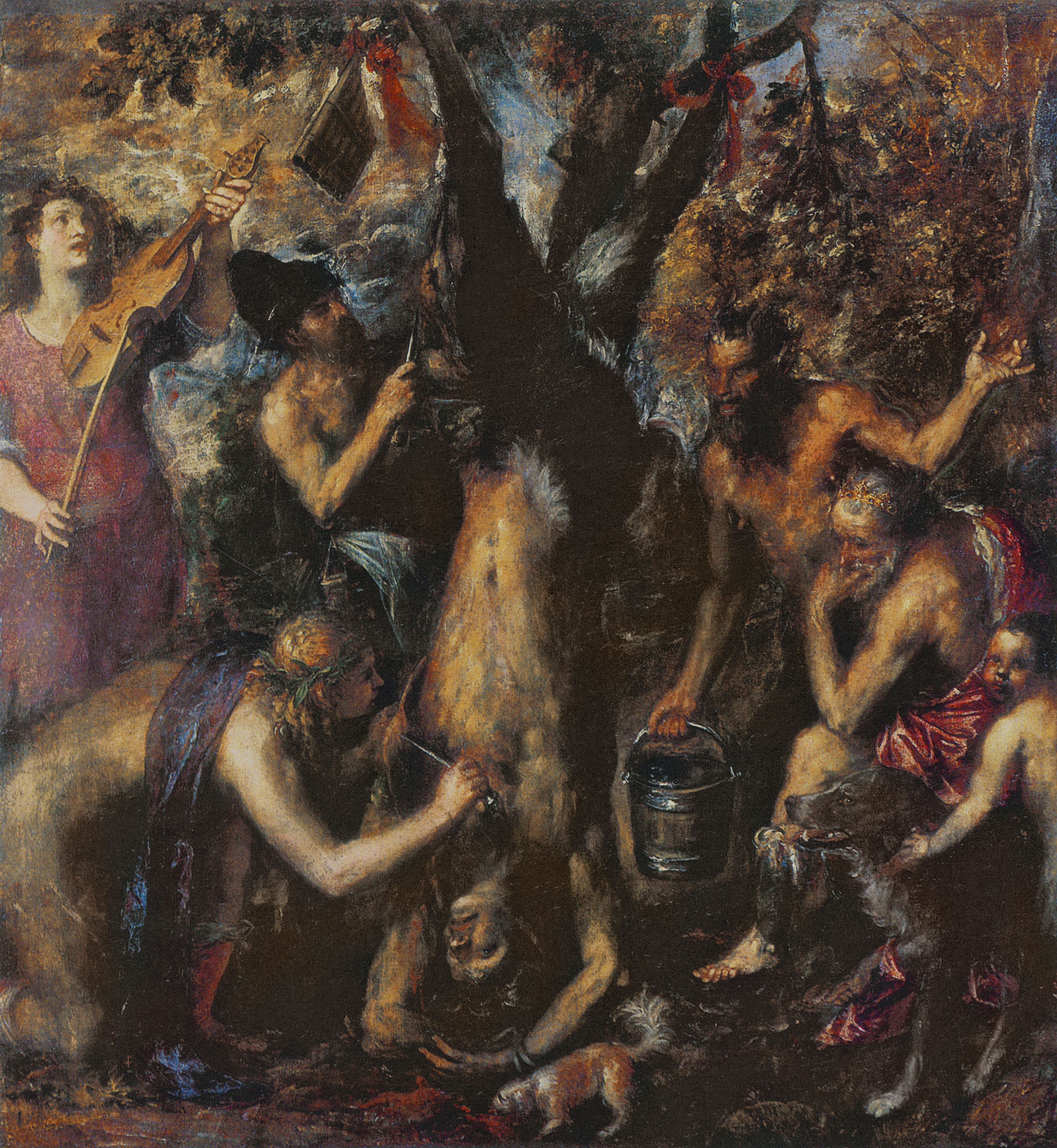
Titian's Flaying of Marsyas (c. 1570–1576) uses satyrs to challenge early modern humanism.

During the Renaissance, satyrs and fauns began to reappear in works of European art. During the Renaissance, no distinction was made between satyrs and fauns and both were usually given human and goat-like features in whatever proportion the artist deemed appropriate. A goat-legged satyr appears at the base of Michelangelo's statue Bacchus (1497). Renaissance satyrs still sometimes appear in scenes of drunken revelry like those from antiquity, but they also sometimes appear in family scenes, alongside female and infant or child satyrs. This trend towards more familial, domestic satyrs may have resulted from conflation with wild men, who, especially in Renaissance depictions from Germany, were often portrayed as living relatively peaceful lives with their families in the wilderness. The most famous representation of a domestic satyr is Albrecht Dürer's 1505 engraving The Satyr's Family, which has been widely reproduced and imitated. This popular portrayal of satyrs and wild men may have also helped give rise to the later European concept of the noble savage.

Satyrs occupied a paradoxical, liminal space in Renaissance art, not only because they were part human and part beast, but also because they were both antique and natural. They were of classical origin, but had an iconographical canon of their own very different from the standard representations of gods and heroes. They could be used to embody what Stephen J. Campbell calls a "monstrous double" of the category in which human beings often placed themselves. It is in this aspect that satyrs appear in Jacopo de' Barbari's c. 1495 series of prints depicting satyrs and naked men in combat and in Piero di Cosimo's Stories of Primitive Man, inspired by Lucretius. Satyrs became seen as "pre-human", embodying all the traits of savagery and barbarism associated with animals, but in human-like bodies. Satyrs also became used to question early modern humanism in ways which some scholars have seen as similar to present-day posthumanism, as in Titian's Flaying of Marsyas (c. 1570–1576). The Flaying of Marysas depicts the scene from Ovid's Metamorphoses in which the satyr Marysas is flayed alive. According to Campbell, the people performing the flaying are shown calmly absorbed in their task, while Marsyas himself even displays "an unlikely patience". The painting reflects a broad continuum between the divine and the bestial.

=== Early modern period ===
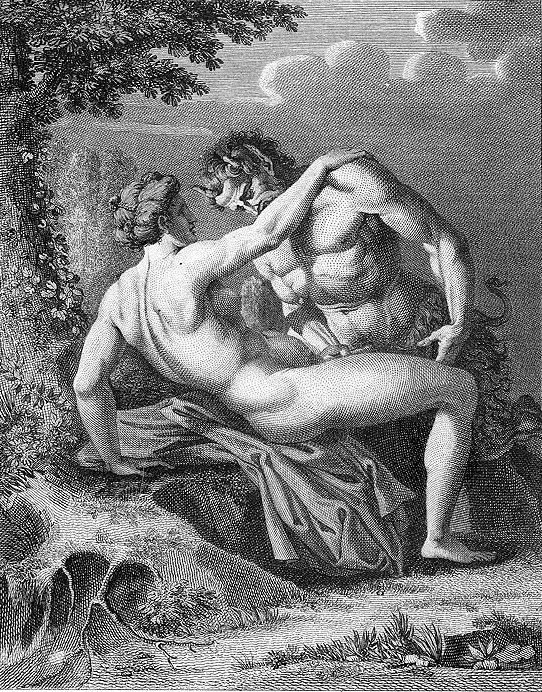
Engraving by Jacques Joseph Coiny from 1798 depicting a satyr engaging in public sex with a nymph

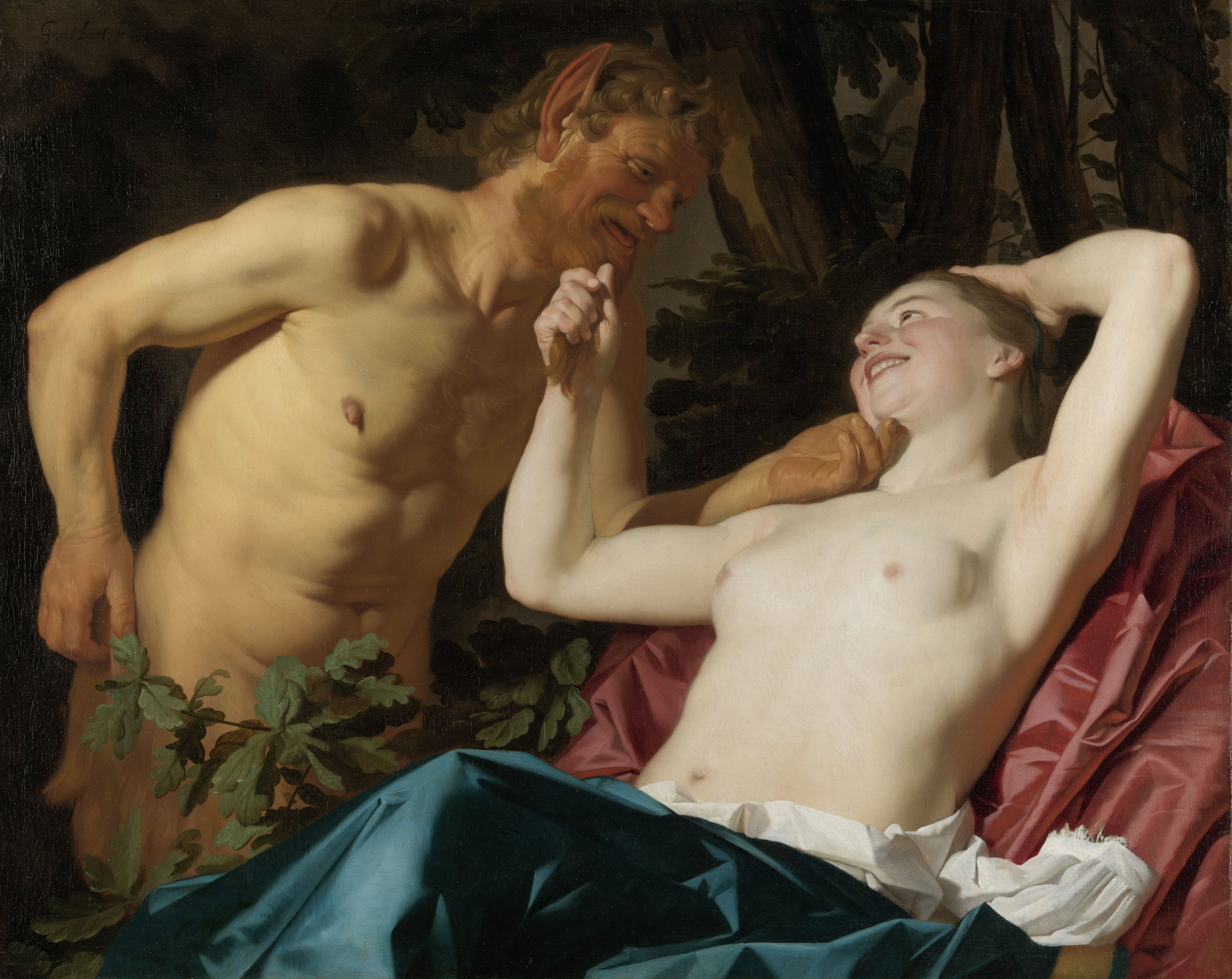
Satyr and Nymph (1623) by Gerard van Honthorst, depicting an obviously consensual affair between a satyr and a nymph

In the 1560 Geneva Bible, the word sa'ir in both of the instances in Isaiah is translated into English as 'satyr'. The 1611 King James Version follows this translation and likewise renders sa'ir as 'satyr'. Edwards states that the King James Version's translation of this phrase and others like it was intended to reduce the strangeness and unfamiliarity of the creatures described in the original Hebrew text by rendering them as names of familiar entities. Edmund Spenser refers to a group of woodland creatures as Satyrs in his epic poem The Faerie Queene. In Canto VI, Una is wandering through the forest when she stumbles upon a "troupe of Fauns and Satyrs far away Within the wood were dancing in a round." Although Satyrs are often negatively characterized in Greek and Roman mythology, the Satyrs in this poem are docile, helpful creatures. This is evident by the way they help protect Una from Sansloy. Sylvanus, the leader, and the rest of the Satyrs become enamored by Una's beauty and begin to worship her as if she is a deity. However, the Satyrs prove to be simple-minded creatures because they begin to worship the donkey she was riding.

In the seventeenth century, satyrs became identified with great apes. In 1699, the English anatomist Edward Tyson (1651–1708) published an account of his dissection of a creature which scholars have now identified as chimpanzee. In this account, Tyson argued that stories of satyrs, wild men, and other hybrid mythological creatures had all originated from the misidentification of apes or monkeys. The French materialist philosopher Julien Offray de La Mettrie (1709–1751) included a section titled "On savage men, called Satyrs" in his Oeuvres philosophiques, in which he describes great apes, identifying them with both satyrs and wild men. Many early accounts of the orangutan describe the males as being sexually aggressive towards human women and towards females of its own species, much like classical Greek satyrs. The first scientific name given to this ape was Simia satyrus.

Relationships between satyrs and nymphs of this period are often portrayed as consensual. This trend is exemplified by the 1623 painting Satyr and Nymph by Gerard van Honthorst, which depicts a satisfied satyr and nymph lasciviously fondling each other after engaging in obviously consensual sex. Both are smiling and the nymph is showing her teeth, a sign commonly used by painters of the era to signify that the woman in question is of loose morals. The satyr's tongue is visible as the nymph playfully tugs on his goat beard and he strokes her chin. Even during this period, however, depictions of satyrs uncovering sleeping nymphs are still common, indicating that their traditional associations with rape and sexual violence had not been forgotten.

=== Nineteenth century ===
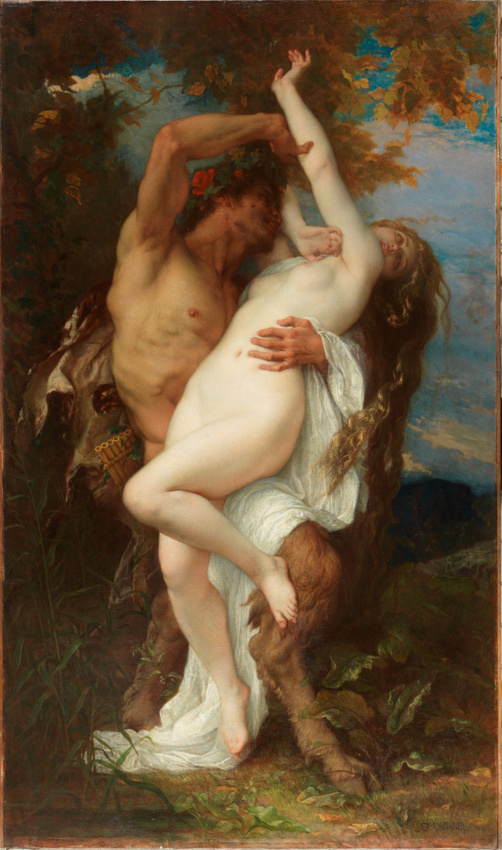
Nymph Abducted by a Faun (1860) by Alexandre Cabanel. Palais des Beaux-Arts de Lille, France.

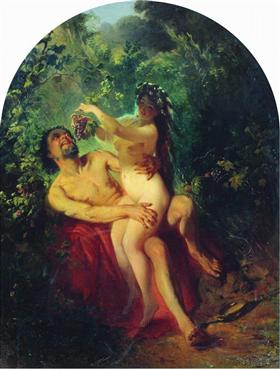
Satyr and nymph (1863) by Konstantin Makovsky. State Museum of Fine Arts of the Republic of Kalmykia, Russia.

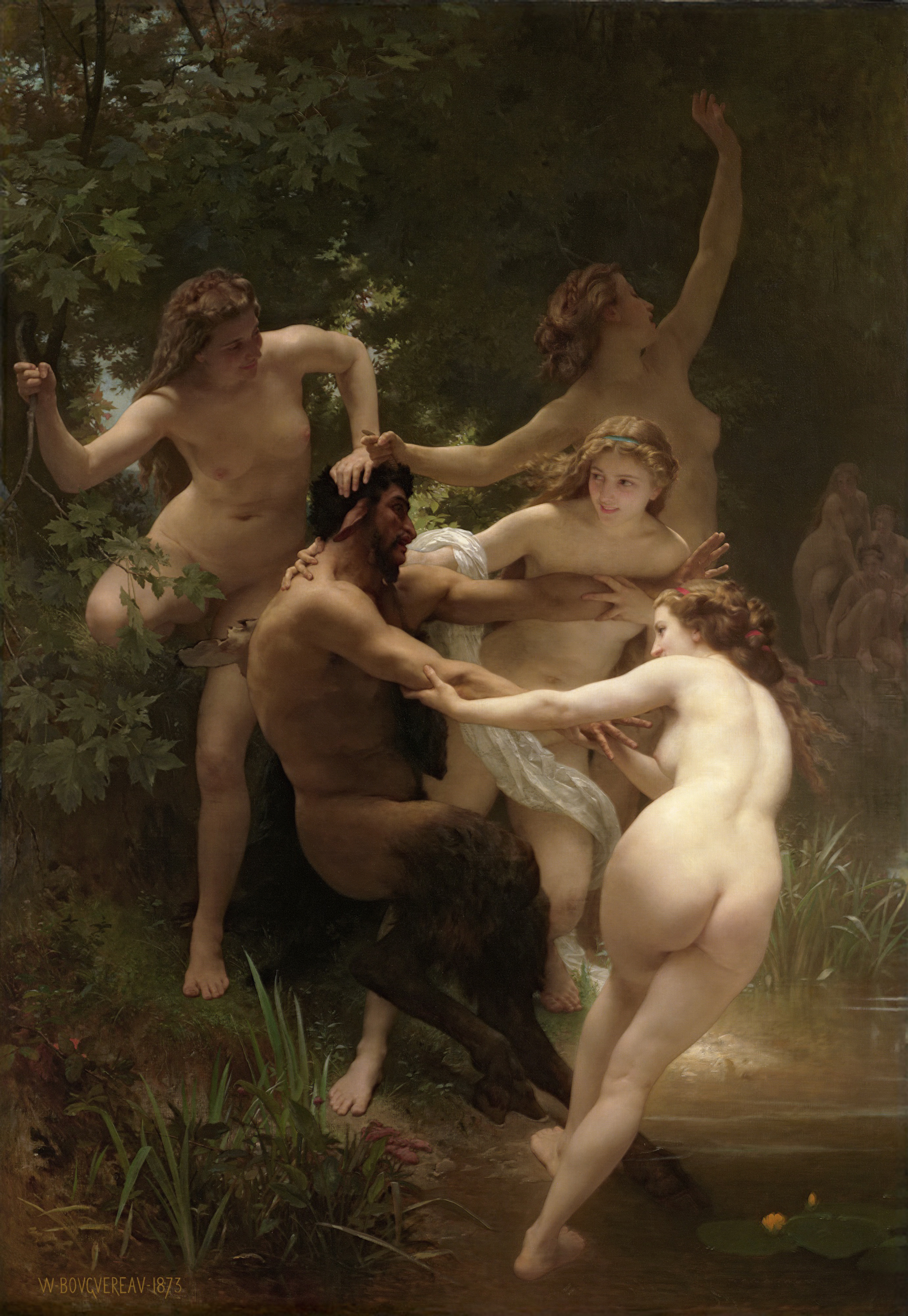
Nymphs and Satyr (1873) by William-Adolphe Bouguereau. Clark Art Institute, USA.

During the nineteenth century, satyrs and nymphs came to often function as a means of representing sexuality without offending Victorian moral sensibilities. In the novel The Marble Faun (1860) by the American author Nathaniel Hawthorne, the Italian count Donatello is described as bearing a remarkable resemblance to one of Praxiteles's marble satyr statues. Like the satyrs of Greek legend, Donatello has a carefree nature. His association with satyrs is further cemented by his intense sexual attraction to the American woman Miriam.

Satyrs and nymphs provided a classical pretext which allowed sexual depictions of them to be seen as objects of high art rather than mere pornography. The French emperor Napoleon III awarded the Academic painter Alexandre Cabanel the Legion of Honour, partly on account of his painting Nymph Abducted by a Faun. In 1873, another French Academicist William-Adolphe Bouguereau painted Nymphs and Satyr, which depicts four nude nymphs dancing around "an unusually submissive satyr", gently coaxing him into the water of a nearby stream. This painting was bought that same year by an American named John Wolfe, who displayed it publicly in a prominent location in the bar at the Hoffman House, a hotel he owned on Madison Square and Broadway. Despite its risqué subject, many women came to the bar to view the painting. The painting was soon mass reproduced on ceramic tiles, porcelain plates, and other luxury items in the United States.

In 1876, Stéphane Mallarmé wrote "The Afternoon of a Faun", a first-person narrative poem about a faun who attempts to kiss two beautiful nymphs while they are sleeping together. He accidentally wakes them up. Startled, they transform into white water birds and fly away, leaving the faun to play his pan pipes alone. Claude Debussy composed a symphonic poem Prélude à l'après-midi d'un faune (Prelude to the Afternoon of a Faun), which was first performed in 1894.

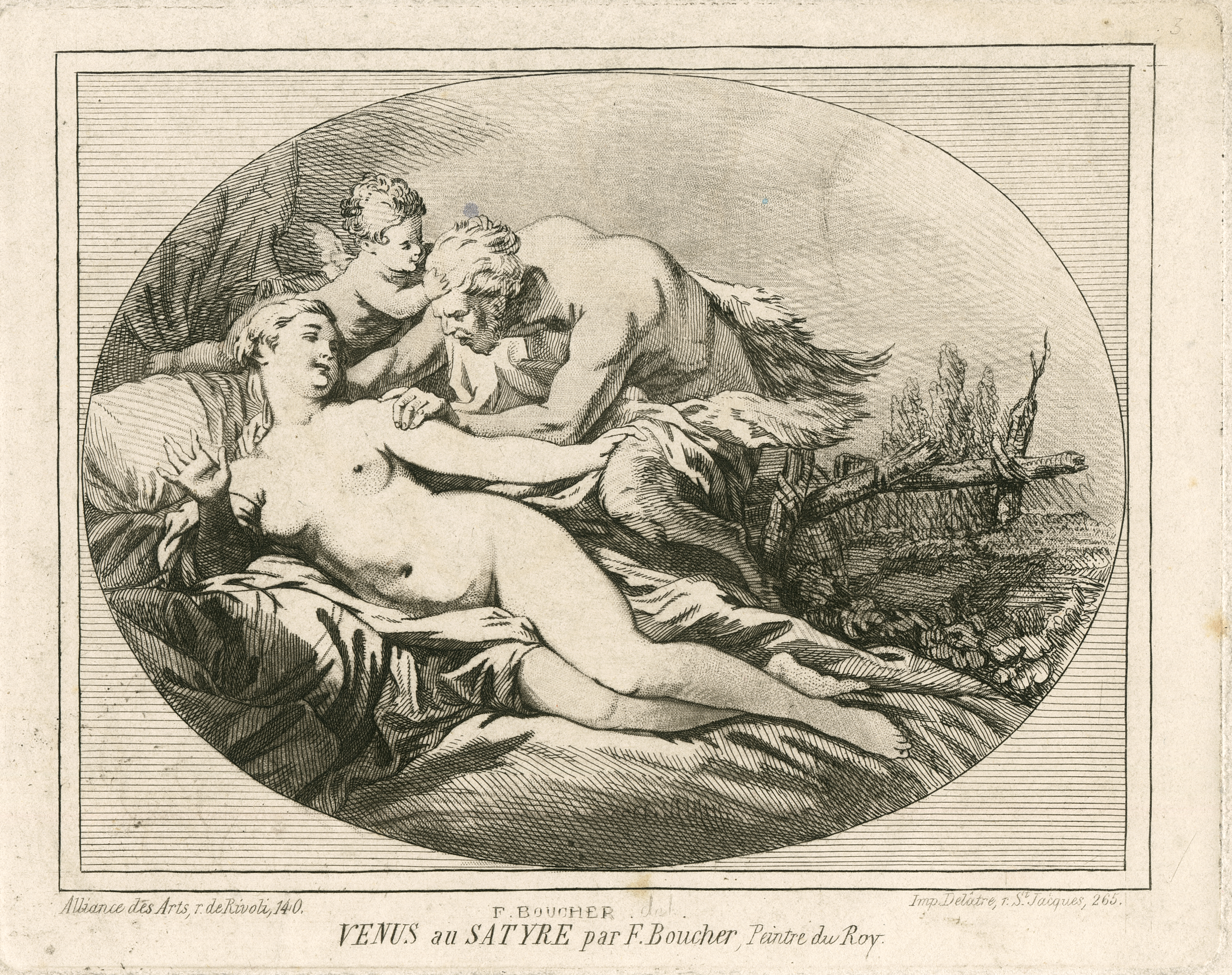
Anonymous (France) after François Boucher, Venus with a Satyr, 19th century, engraving and etching

The late nineteenth-century German Existentialist philosopher Friedrich Nietzsche was either unaware of or chose to ignore the fact that, in all the earliest representations, satyrs are depicted as horse-like. He accordingly defined a satyr as a "bearded" creature "who derived his name and attributes from the goat." Nietzsche excluded the horse-like satyrs of Greek tradition from his consideration entirely and argued that tragedy had originated from a chorus of men dressed up as satyrs or goats (tragoi). Thus, Nietzsche held that tragedy had begun as a Dionysian activity. Nietzsche's rejection of the early evidence for horse-like satyrs was a mistake his critics severely excoriated him for. Nonetheless, he was the first modern scholar to recognize the full importance of satyrs in Greek culture and tradition, as Dionysian symbols of humanity's close ties to the animal kingdom. Like the Greeks, Nietzsche envisioned satyrs as essentially humans stripped down to their most basic and bestial instincts.

=== Twentieth and twenty-first centuries ===
Febo Mari's 1917 silent film Il Fauno is about a statue of a faun that comes to life and falls in love with a female model

In 1908, the French painter Henri Matisse produced his own Nymph and Satyr painting, in which the animal nature of the satyr is drastically minimized. The satyr is given human legs, but is exceptionally hairy. The seduction element is removed altogether; the satyr simply extends his arms towards the nymph, who lies on the ground, defeated. Penny Florence writes that the "generic scene displays little sensuality" and that the main factor distinguishing it is its tone, because "[i]t does not seem convincing as a rape, despite the nymph's reluctance." In 1912, Vaslav Nijinsky choreographed Debussy's symphonic poem Prelude to the Afternoon of a Faun as a ballet and danced in it as the lead role of the faun. The choreography of the ballet and Nijinsky's performance were both highly erotic and sexually charged, causing widespread scandal among upper-class Parisians. In the 1980 biographical film Nijinsky, directed by Herbert Ross, Nijinsky, who is played by George de la Peña, is portrayed as actually masturbating on stage in front of the entire live audience during the climax of the dance.

The 1917 Italian silent film Il Fauno, directed by Febo Mari, is about a statue of a faun who comes to life and falls in love with a female model. Fauns appear in the animated dramatization of Ludwig van Beethoven's Symphony No. 6 (1808) in the 1940 Disney animated film Fantasia. Their goat-legs are portrayed as brightly colored, but their hooves are black. They play the Pan pipes and, like traditional satyrs and fauns, are portrayed as mischievous. One young faun plays hide-and-seek with a unicorn and imitates a statue of a faun atop a pedestal. Though the fauns are not portrayed as overtly sexual, they do assist the Cupids in pairing the centaurs into couples. A drunken Bacchus appears in the same scene.

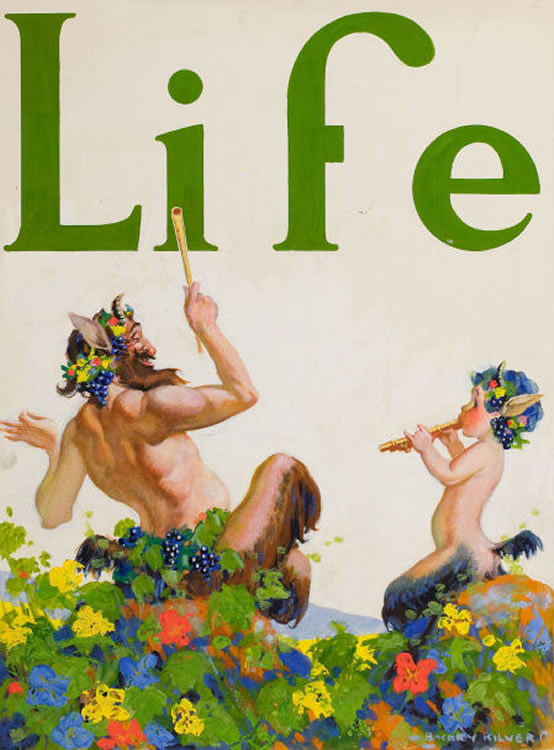
Satyr and Pan by Cory Kilvert (Life, 26 Apr 1923)

A faun named Mr. Tumnus appears in the classic juvenile fantasy novel The Lion, the Witch and the Wardrobe (1950) by C. S. Lewis. Mr. Tumnus has goat legs and horns, but also a tail long enough for him to carry it draped over his arm to prevent it from dragging in the snow. He is a domesticated figure who lacks the bawdiness and hypersexuality that characterized classical satyrs and fauns. Instead, Mr. Tumnus wears a scarf and carries an umbrella and lives in a cozy cave with a bookshelf with works such as The Life and Letters of Silenus, Nymphs and their Ways, and Is Man a Myth?.

The satyr has appeared in all five editions of the Dungeons & Dragons role-playing game, having been introduced in 1976 in the earliest edition, in Supplement IV: Gods, Demi-Gods & Heroes (1976), then in the first edition of the Monster Manual (1977), where it is described as a sylvan woodland inhabitant primarily interested in sport such as frolicking, piping, and chasing wood nymphs. The life history of satyrs was further detailed in Dragon No. 155 (March 1990), in "The Ecology of the Satyr". The satyr was later detailed as a playable character race in The Complete Book of Humanoids (1993), and is later presented as a playable character race again in Player's Option: Skills & Powers (1995). The satyr appears in the Monster Manual for the 3.0 edition. Savage Species (2003) presented the satyr as both a race and a playable class. The satyr appears in the revised Monster Manual for version 3.5 and also appears in the Monster Manual for the 4th edition, and as a playable character race in the Heroes of the Feywild sourcebook (2011).

Matthew Barney's art video Drawing Restraint 7 (1993) includes two satyrs wrestling in the backseat of a moving limousine. A satyr named Grover Underwood appears in the young adult fantasy novel The Lightning Thief (2005) by American author Rick Riordan, as well as in subsequent novels in the series Percy Jackson & the Olympians. Though consistently referred to as a "satyr", Grover is described as having goat legs, pointed ears, and horns. Grover is not portrayed with the sexually obscene traits that characterized classical Greek satyrs. Instead, he is the loyal protector to the main character Percy Jackson, who is the son of a mortal woman and the god Poseidon.

== See also ==
- Fairy
- Kinnara
- List of hybrid creatures in folklore
- The Birth of Tragedy, by Nietzsche
- Thiasos, the Dionysian retinue
- The Trackers of Oxyrhynchus, a play
- Maryland Goatman
- Pope Lick Monster
- Lake Worth Monster
