= Scirtus (mythology) =

Leaders of the satyrs in Greek mythology

In Greek mythology, Scirtus or Scirtos (Ancient Greek: Σκιρτὸς means 'leaper') was one of the leaders of the satyrs, who joined the army of Dionysus in his campaign against India.
