= Phlegraeus =

In Greek mythology, Phlegraeus or Phlegraios (Ancient Greek: Φλεγραῖος) was one of the leaders of the satyrs who joined the army of Dionysus in his campaign against India.
