= Cres (mythology) =

Possible eponym of the island Crete in Greek mythology

In Greek mythology, Cres (Ancient Greek: Κρής Kres, gen. Κρητός) was an eponym of the island Crete. Stephanus of Byzantium distinguishes between two figures of this name: one was a son of Zeus and the nymph Idaea, and the other a Cretan autochthon who became the first ruler of Crete. According to Cinaethon of Sparta, Cres was the father of Talos.

== Mythology ==
The autochthonous Cres is mentioned in other accounts as the native king of a whole earth-born nation, the Eteocretans ("true Cretans"), and the inventor of a number of items that were crucial for the development of the human civilization. He was said to be one of the Curetes.

According to a tradition recorded by Stephanus, it was during Cres's reign that Tectaphus, son of Dorus, migrated to Crete from Thessaly, followed by Dorian and Achaean tribes, as well as by those of the Pelasgians that had not migrated to Tyrrhenia.

Several authors identified Cres as one of the Curetes, possibly their king, and therefore a caretaker of the young Zeus who was hidden by him in a cave on Crete.

== See also ==
- Crete (mythology)
