= Napaeus (mythology) =

In Greek mythology, Napaeus or Napaios (Ancient Greek: Ναπαίῳ) was the "horned" satyr leader who joined the army of Dionysus in his campaign against India.
