= Lenobius =

In Greek mythology, Lenobius (Ancient Greek: Ληνοβίῳ) was one of the leaders of the satyrs who joined the army of Dionysus in his campaign against India.
