= Cissus (mythology) =

Satyr in Greek mythology

In Greek mythology, Cissus or Kissos (Ancient Greek: Κισσός, romanized: Kissós, lit. 'ivy') was a satyr who was turned into an ivy plant. His story survives only in Nonnus's early fifth century AD epic poem Dionysiaca.

== Mythology ==
Cissus, together with another satyr Leneus, contested in foot running with Ampelus, a young Phrygian loved by Dionysus.

Springheel Lyaios [i.e. Dionysus] cried his summons aloud, and first up leapt windfoot Leneus, then on either side of him highstepping Cissos and charming Ampelos stood up. They stood in a row, confident in the quick soles of their straightfaring feet. Cissos flew with stormy movement of his feet just skimming the top of the ground as he touched it. Leneus was running behind him quick as the winds of heaven and warming the back of the sprinter with his breath, close behind the leader, and he touched footstep with footstep on the dust as it dropped, with following feet: the space between them both was no more than the rod leaves open before the bosom of a girl working at the loom, close to the firm breast. Ampelos came third and last. Dionysos saw them out of the corner of his eye, and melted with jealousy that the two competitors should be in front, afraid they might win and Ampelos come in behind them; so the god helped him, breathed strength into him, and made the boy swifter than the spinning gale. Then Cissos, first of the two in the race, striving so hard for the prize, stumbled over a wet place on the shore, slipt and fell in the sandy slush; Leneus had to check the course of his feet, and his knees lost their swing: so both competitors were passed and Ampelos carried off the victory. The old Seilenoi shouted Euoi! amazed at the victory of the youth. He received the first prize with soft hair flowing, Leneus took the second full of envy, for he understood the jealous trick of Lyaios and his passion; Cissos eyed his comrades with look abashed, as he held out his hand for the last prize discontented.

Later on, Cissus was metamorphosed into an ivy plant while he was climbing with legs across the branches in a tree.

Cissos, the lovely youth, shall creep into a plant, and he shall be the highflying ivy that entwines about the branches.
