= Oestrus (mythology) =

In Greek mythology, Oestrus or Oistros (Ancient Greek: Οἴστρῳ, meaning 'gadfly' or 'sting') was one of the leaders of the satyrs who joined the army of Dionysus in his campaign against India.
