= Hypsicerus =

In Greek mythology, Hypsicerus or Hypsiceros (Ancient Greek: Ὑψίκερως means 'high-horned') was one of the leaders of the satyrs, who joined the army of Dionysus in his campaign against India.
