= Ciscissus =

Town and bishopric of ancient Cappadocia

Coordinates: 38°09′14″N 35°47′13″E

Ciscissus or Kiskisos was a town and bishopric of ancient Cappadocia. In Roman and Byzantine times the town's name was sometimes shortened to Cissus and belonged to the Roman province of Cappadocia Prima. It became a Christian bishopric, a suffragan of the metropolitan see of Caesarea in Cappadocia, the capital of the province. The names of two of its bishops are known from extant contemporary documents: Plato was at the Trullan Council of 692, and Soterichus at the Second Council of Nicaea in 787. No longer a residential bishopric, Ciscissus is today listed by the Catholic Church as a titular see.

Its site is located near Yaylacık, Asiatic Turkey.
