= Ampelos =

Deity in Greek mythology

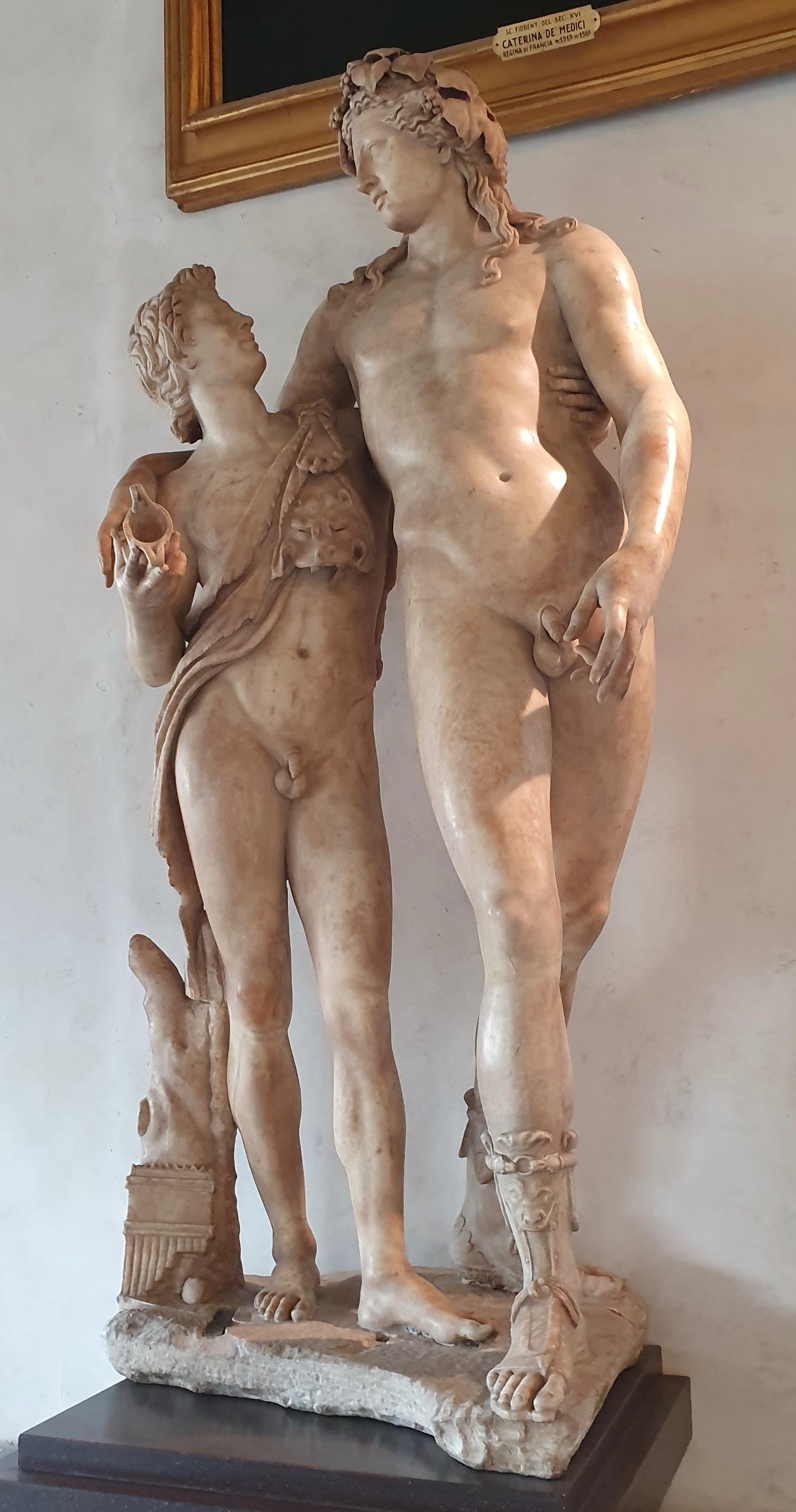
Bacchus e Ampelus (Uffizi, Florence)

Ampelos (Ancient Greek: Ἂμπελος, lit. "Vine") or Ampelus (Latin) was a personification of the grapevine and lover of Dionysus in Greek and Bacchus in Roman mythology. He was a satyr that Dionysus either turned into a constellation or the grape vine.

== Mythology ==
=== Nonnus ===
In Nonnus's etiology, Ampelos is a beautiful satyr youth, who was loved by Dionysus, and whose death was foreseen by the god. There are two versions of his death and Dionysus's reaction to it. According to Nonnus, Ampelos was gored to death by a wild bull after he mocked the goddess Selene, a scene described as follows:

"[Ampelos, love of Dionysos, rode upon the back of a wild bull:] He shouted boldly to the fullfaced Moon (Mene)—'Give me best, Selene, horned driver of cattle! Now I am both—I have horns and I ride a bull!'
So he called out boasting to the round Moon. Selene looked with a jealous eye through the air, to see how Ampelos rode on the murderous marauding bull. She sent him a cattlechasing gadfly; and the bull, pricked continually all over by the sharp sting, galloped away like a horse through pathless tracts [it then threw and gored him to death]"

Upset by his death, Dionysus transformed Ampelos's body into the first grape vine and created wine from his blood.

=== Ovid ===
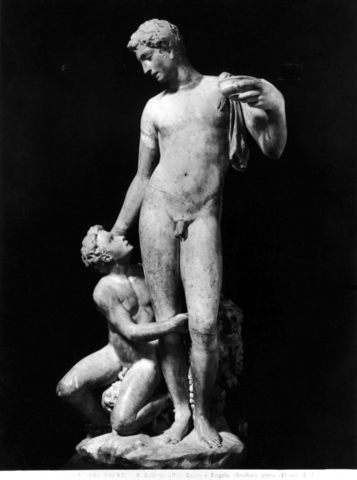
Bacchus and Ampelos ". Pre-1865 image of a Roman statue in the Galleria degli Uffizi, Florence.

The second version involves grape vines in a different manner. According to Ovid:

"the reckless youth fell picking gaudy grapes on a branch. Liber [Dionysos] lifted the lost boy to the stars," turning him into one of the stars of the constellation Vindemitor or Vindiatrix (better known as Boötes).

== Dryad ==
Various ampelose—also "Ampelos" in the singular—also appear in Greek mythology a variety of hamadryad.
