= Tectaphus =

In Greek mythology, Tectaphus (Ancient Greek: Τέκταφος, romanized: Téktaphos) may refer to the following characters:

- Tectaphus, another name of Tectamus, the son of Dorus, who migrated to Crete where he married Cretheus’ daughter and ruled over the said island. By her, Tectaphus became the father of Asterius, his successor and future husband of Europa.
- Tectaphus, one of the Lapiths who fought against the centaurs, being killed by Phaecomes. He was son of Olenus.
- Tectaphus, a chieftain who armed himself against Dionysus in the Indian War. Once, when King Deriades of India kept him in prison, he had been saved from death by suckling the milk from the breast of his daughter Eerie (similar story is that of Mycon). Tectaphus was killed by Eurymedon.
