= Charles H. Whedbee =

American lawyer

Charles Harry Whedbee (born May 13, 1911 in Greenville, North Carolina, and died there on September 21, 1990), was a noted lawyer, judge and author of local history and the lore, legends and ghost stories of the Outer Banks of North Carolina.

== Early life and education ==
He was educated at the University of North Carolina, taking his law degree in 1932. He has been Solicitor of Pitt County Court and served as a Municipal Court Judge in Greenville, in Pitt County, North Carolina. He and his wife, Rachel, and their dog, Chief Manteo of Roanoke, spent a large part of their summers at Nags Head, North Carolina, where Judge Whedbee had been a regular, if sometimes part-time, resident since infancy.

== Folklorist ==
He classed his tales in three areas: stories he knew were true because they happened around him; those he heard about from people who he trusted as being honest and reliable people; and stories which he heard second or third hand, and that may have only a seed of truth. He began telling legends of the coastal area on WNCT-TV in Greenville, originally as a guest host on the "Carolina Today" program. Following this, his storytelling prowess caught the ear of John F. Blair, a publisher in Winston-Salem (now Blair), who requested he write some of his stories down for a book. The success of that volume led to four more and an anthology of his best stories.

Many of his stories document the legends of the Outer Banks. "In 2004, the staff of John F. Blair, Publisher, collected 13 of Judge Whedbee's finest stories for the volume titled Pirates, Ghosts, and Coastal Lore." His other stories have also been reprinted in other books, such as An Outer Banks Reader Edited by David Stick, UNC Press Books, 1998 and even a homeowners association on the Outer Banks repeats his tales.

== Death ==
He died on September 21, 1990, and is buried at the Cherry Hill Cemetery in Greenville, NC.

== Bibliography ==
- Whedbee, Charles Harry. Blackbeard's Cup and Stories of the Outer Banks. Winston-Salem, N.C.: J.F. Blair, 1989. Abstract: Contains sixteen tales to explain local phenomena and happenings on the eastern shore of North Carolina. Contents: The guns of Vandemere - The legend of the pelican - St. Elmo's fire - Blackbeard's cup - New Berne's bleeding arch - Horace and the coinjock charade - Ocracoke-vs-the King of Spain - The true story of Rasmus Midgett - The cora tree - Ephraim's light - The ghostly hornpipe - Sir William Shakespeare's wreck - Doctor Dillard's treasure - East Lake accommodation - The magic lute - The sea angel.
- Whedbee, Charles Harry. The Flaming Ship of Ocracoke & Other Tales of the Outer Banks. Winston-Salem, N.C.: J.F. Blair, 1971.
- Whedbee, Charles Harry. Legends of the Outer Banks and Tar Heel Tidewater. Winston-Salem [N.C.]: J.F. Blair, 1966. Contents: The riddle of Shallotte Inlet - The ghost deer of Roanoke - Beechland - Jockey's Ridge and Nag's Head - The pirate lights of Pamlico Sound - Old Quork - The seven sisters - Hatteras Jack - Lady in distress - The devil's hoofprints - Swanquarter incident - The witch of Nag's Head woods - A door for St. Andrews - The phantom schooner - The boozhyot - The boozhyot apocrypha - "I shall but love thee better after death" - Word from the sea.
- Whedbee, Charles Harry. Outer Banks Mysteries & Seaside Stories. Winston-Salem: J.F. Blair, 1978. The book jacket says: "Once again, the North Carolina Coast is the backdrop for a collection of delightful tales by Whedbee. Outer Banks Mysteries & Seaside Stories is Whedbee's third volume in a series of books that firmly establishes him as one of the state's most famous contemporary raconteurs. Whedbee's collections of legends and folklore have become regional classics. Pure Delight!" Add this one to your collection or let this begin your collection of the legends and folklores of North Carolina!"
- Whedbee, Charles Harry. Outer Banks Tales to Remember. Winston-Salem, N.C.: J.F. Blair, 1985. Contents: Peter Painter's revenge - The fable of the Cobia - How Oregon Inlet got its name - Tea parties and patriots - The legend of Batts' grave - The tale of the sea horse - A dismal Swamp love story - Daniel Keath - A modern ghost - Some Chocowinity ghosts - Mr. Hamilton's light - The holy ghost shell - The great serpent of the fresh ponds - The Mattamuskeet apple - The fire bird - The sea hag - The devil's Christmas tree.
- Whedbee, Charles Harry. Pirates, Ghosts, and Coastal Lore: The Best of Judge Whedbee. [Winston-Salem, N.C.]: John F. Blair, 2004.
