= The Minotaur Takes a Cigarette Break =

2000 novel by Steven Sherrill

- Author: Steven Sherrill
- Set in: Piedmont, North Carolina
- Publisher: John F. Blair
- Publication date: 2000
- Pages: 313

The Minotaur Takes a Cigarette Break is a 2000 novel by Steven Sherrill that imagines the Minotaur living and working in the modern Southern United States.

== Plot ==
The is set in the North Carolina Piedmont region of the Southern United States. It follows the Minotaur, an immortal half-man half-bull creature from Greek mythology, who is now known as "M", who has been freed from his labyrinth. M, much diminished in power, works as a fry cook at a popular local restaurant and lives in a trailer park. Over the course of the novel, he finds himself grappling with a variety of human interactions, which range from fascination to fear. He falls in love with Kelly, a waitress working at the same restaurant.

== Writing and publication ==
The Minotaur Takes a Cigarette Break was Steven Sherrill's first novel. The novel began as a poem by the same title that he wrote at the Iowa Writers' Workshop. Sherrill based it on his experiences growing up near Charlotte, North Carolina, visiting trailer parks, and working as a cook while attending Central Piedmont Community College. Five chapters of The Minotaur Takes a Cigarette Break are poems.

Sherrill submitted the novel to, and was rejected by, several major American publishers. It was published by John F. Blair, a small press based in North Carolina, in 2000. The first edition was 313 pages.

=== Sequel ===
Sherrill wrote a sequel novel, The Minotaur Takes His Own Sweet Time, which was also published by Blair, in 2016.

== Reception ==
The novel was one of Blair's most successful published works, and by 2004 had sold over 4,000 copies. It was well received by reviewers, who praised Sherrill's prose, considered the novel's premise inventive, and felt it to be a vivid depiction of life in the Piedmont. Several felt the Minotaur to be a sympathetic character; a reviewer writing in The Atlanta Journal-Constitution compared M to the Elephant Man, and others described his understanding of human life as voyeurism. A reviewer for The New York Times felt that Sherrill's depiction of the Minotaur highlights humanity's "double nature" containing many "hybrids of the vulgar and the sublime".
