= Minotaur =

Creature of Greek mythology

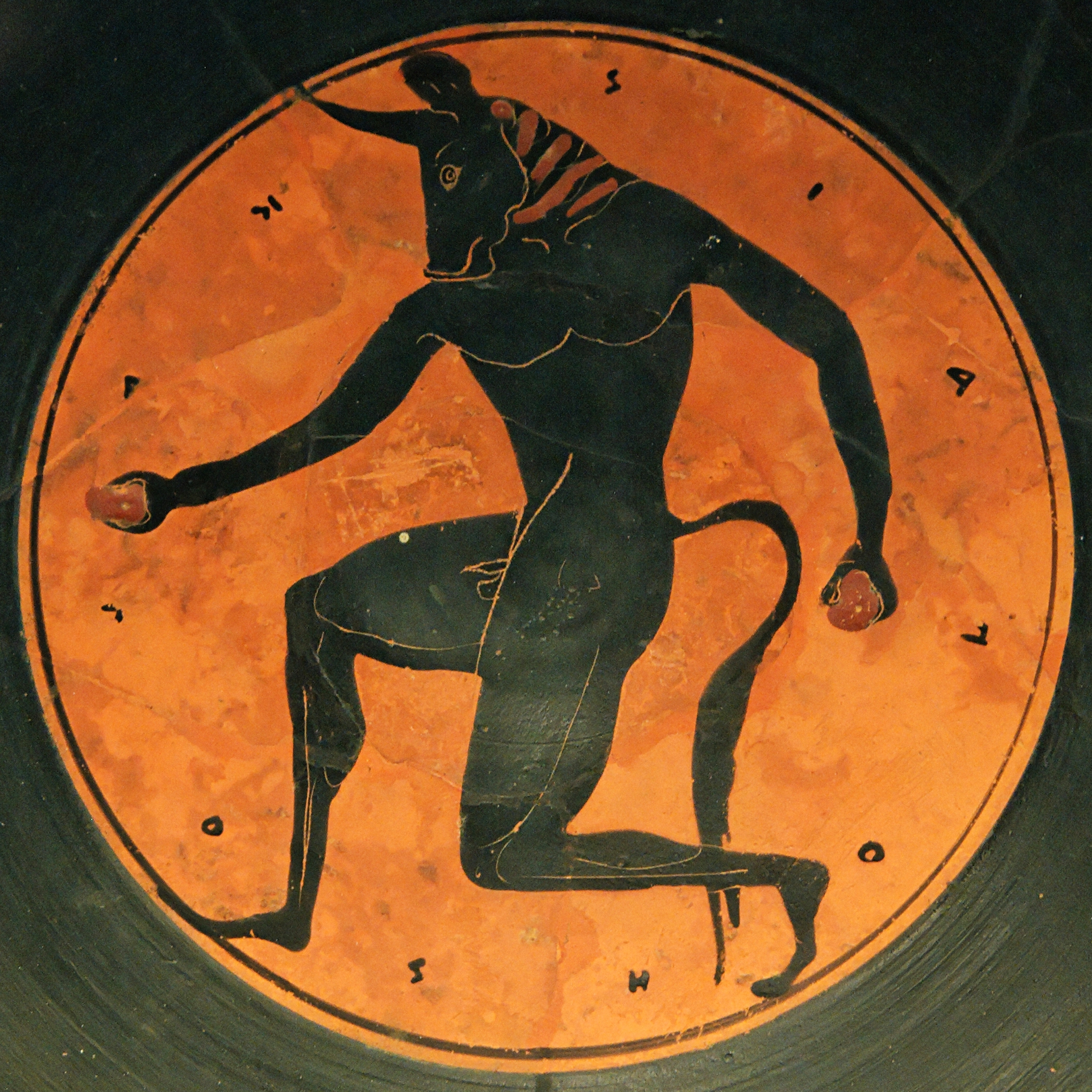
- The Minotaur on an Attic kylix tondo from c. 515 BC with a kalos inscription. (Note: In Ancient Greek: ὁ παῖς καλός, ho pais kalos meaning "the boy is beautiful", a common epigraphic formula found on Attic pottery)
- Other names: Asterion
- Abode: Labyrinth, Crete

Genealogy
- Parents: Cretan Bull and Pasiphaë
- Siblings: Ariadne, Androgeus, Glaucus (son of Minos), Deucalion, Phaedra

In Greek mythology, the Minotaur (Note: /ˈmaɪnətɔːr, ˈmɪnətɔːr/ MY-nə-tor, MIN-ə-tor, US: /ˈmɪnətɑːr, -oʊ-/ MIN-ə-tar, -oh-;) (Ancient Greek: Μινώταυρος, romanized: Mīnṓtauros), also known as Asterion or Asterius, is a mythical creature portrayed during classical antiquity with the head and tail of a bull and the body of a man or, as described by Roman poet Ovid, a being "part man and part bull". (Note: According to Ovid: semibovemque virum semivirumque bovem, one of the three lines that his friends would have deleted from his work, and one of the three that he, selecting independently, would preserve at all cost, in the apocryphal anecdote told by Albinovanus Pedo.) He dwelt at the center of the Labyrinth, which was an elaborate maze-like construction (Note: In a counter-intuitive cultural development going back at least to Cretan coins of the 4th century BCE, many visual patterns representing the Labyrinth do not have dead ends like a maze; instead, a single path winds to the center.) designed by the architect Daedalus and his son Icarus, upon command of King Minos of Crete. According to tradition, every nine years the people of Athens were compelled by King Minos to choose fourteen young noble citizens (seven men and seven women) to be offered as sacrificial victims to the Minotaur in retribution for the death of Minos's son Androgeus. The Minotaur was eventually slain by the Athenian hero Theseus, who managed to navigate the labyrinth with the help of a golden thread offered to him by the King's daughter, Ariadne.

== Etymology ==
The Minotaur was called Minotaurus [miːnoːˈtau̯rʊs] in Latin and Θevrumineš in Etruscan. English pronunciation of the word "Minotaur" is varied; the following can be found in dictionaries: /ˈmaɪnətɔːr, -noʊ-/ MY-nə-tor, -noh-, /ˈmɪnətɑːr, ˈmɪnoʊ-/ MIN-ə-tar, MIN-oh-, /ˈmɪnətɔːr, ˈmɪnoʊ-/ MIN-ə-tor, MIN-oh-.

The word "Minotaur" derives from the Ancient Greek Μινώταυρος [miːnɔ̌ːtau̯ros] a compound of the name Μίνως (Minos) and the noun ταῦρος tauros meaning 'bull', thus it is translated as the 'Bull of Minos'. In Crete, the Minotaur was known by the name Asterion (Ἀστερίων) or Asterios (Ἀστέριος), a name shared with Minos's foster-father. (Note: Hesiod says of Zeus's establishment of Europa in Crete: "... he made her live with Asterion the king of the Cretans. There she conceived and bore three sons, Minos, Sarpedon, and Rhadamanthys.")

"Minotaur" was originally a proper noun in reference to this mythical figure. That is, there was only the one Minotaur. The notion of other minotaurs surfaced in the early middle ages, perhaps first in The Cosmography of Aethicus Ister in the 7th or 8th century, which speaks of minotaur cubs raised by Amazons for use in war. The Hereford Mappa Mundi (ca 1300) depicts what might be a minotaur, and the map's legend refers to "wild animals similar to the minotaur". It is not clear whether the middle ages envisioned a race of minotaurs, or simply that minotaurs arose from further human–bull unions: Gerald of Wales (12th/13th century) attributed the existence of ox-men in Ireland to the Irish taste for bestiality. The notion of minotaurs as a race of beings became more common in 20th century fantasy fiction.

== Creation myth ==
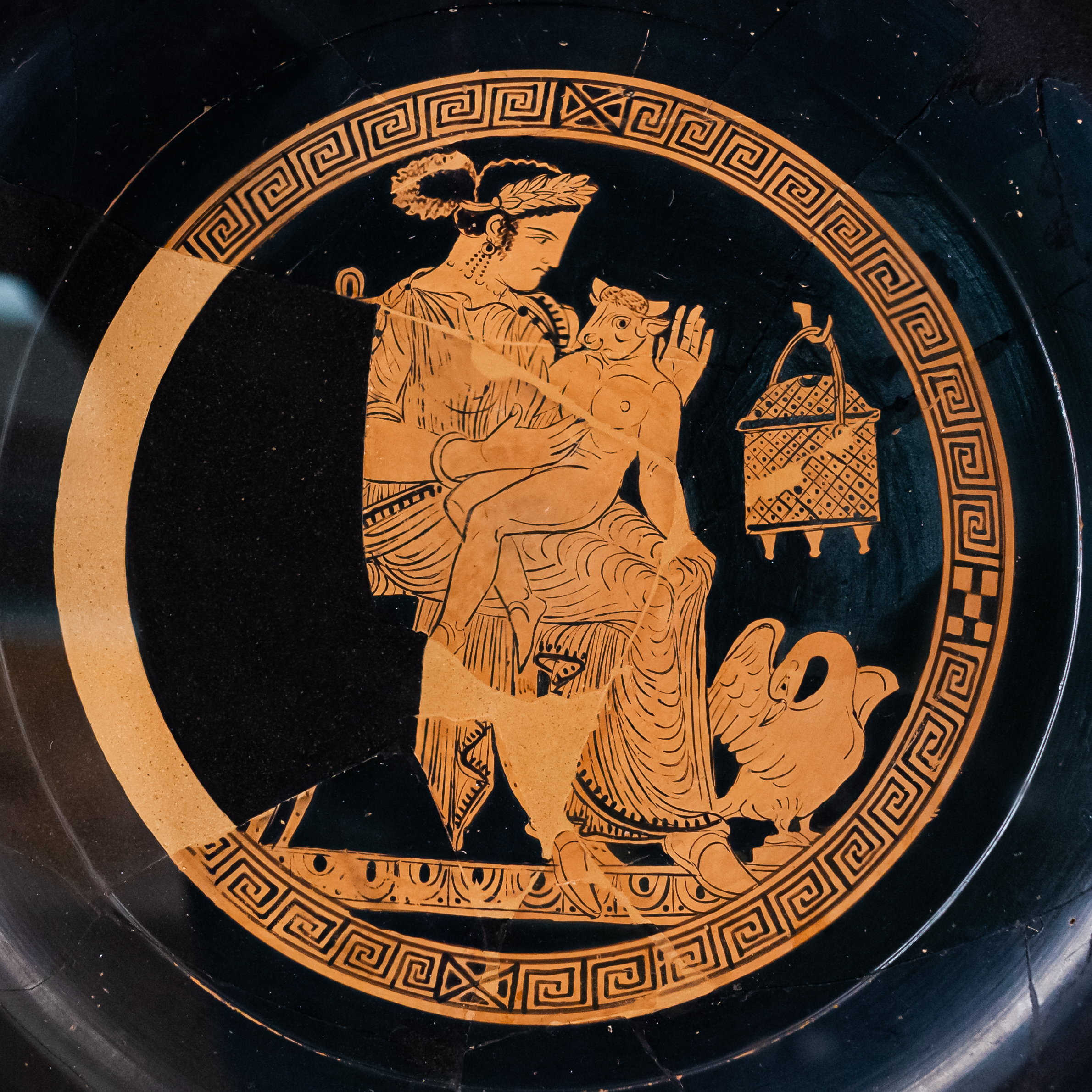
Pasiphaë and baby Minotaur, Attic red-figure kylix found at Etruscan Vulci. Italy. Currently at the Cabinet des Médailles, Paris

After ascending the throne of the island of Crete, Minos competed with his brothers as ruler. Minos prayed to the sea god Poseidon to send him a snow-white bull as a sign of the god's favor. Minos was to sacrifice the bull to honor Poseidon, but owing to the bull's beauty he decided instead to keep him. Minos believed that the god would accept a substitute sacrifice. To punish Minos, Poseidon arranged with Aphrodite for Minos's wife, Pasiphaë, to fall in love with the bull. Pasiphaë had the master craftsman, Daedalus, fashion for her a hollow wooden cow, into which she climbed to let the bull mate with her. She then fell pregnant and bore Asterius, the Minotaur, making him a grandchild of Helios. Pasiphaë nursed the Minotaur but he grew in size and became ferocious. As the unnatural offspring of a woman and a beast, the Minotaur had no natural source of nourishment, and thus devoured humans for sustenance. Minos, following advice from the oracle at Delphi, had Daedalus construct a gigantic Labyrinth to hold the Minotaur. Its location was near Minos's palace in Knossos.

== Appearance ==
The Minotaur is commonly represented in Classical art with the body of a man and the head and tail of a bull. According to Sophocles's Trachiniai, when the river spirit Achelous seduced Deianira, one of the guises he assumed was a man with the head of a bull. From classical antiquity through the Renaissance, the Minotaur appears at the center of many depictions of the Labyrinth. (Note: Several examples are shown in Kern (2000).) Ovid's Latin account of the Minotaur, which did not describe which half was bull and which half man, was the most widely available during the Middle Ages, and several later versions show a man's head and torso on a bull's body—the reverse of the Classical configuration, reminiscent of a centaur. (Note: Examples include illustrations 204, 237, 238, and 371 in Kern.) This alternative tradition survived into the Renaissance, and is reflected in Dryden's elaborated translation of Virgil's description of the Minotaur in Book VI of the Aeneid: "The lower part a beast, a man above/The monument of their polluted love." It still figures in some modern depictions, such as Steele Savage's illustrations for Edith Hamilton's Mythology (1942). (A mythical creature fitting this description is sometimes known as a bucentaur, but this is a folk etymology derived from the Venetian bucentaur.)

== Theseus myth ==
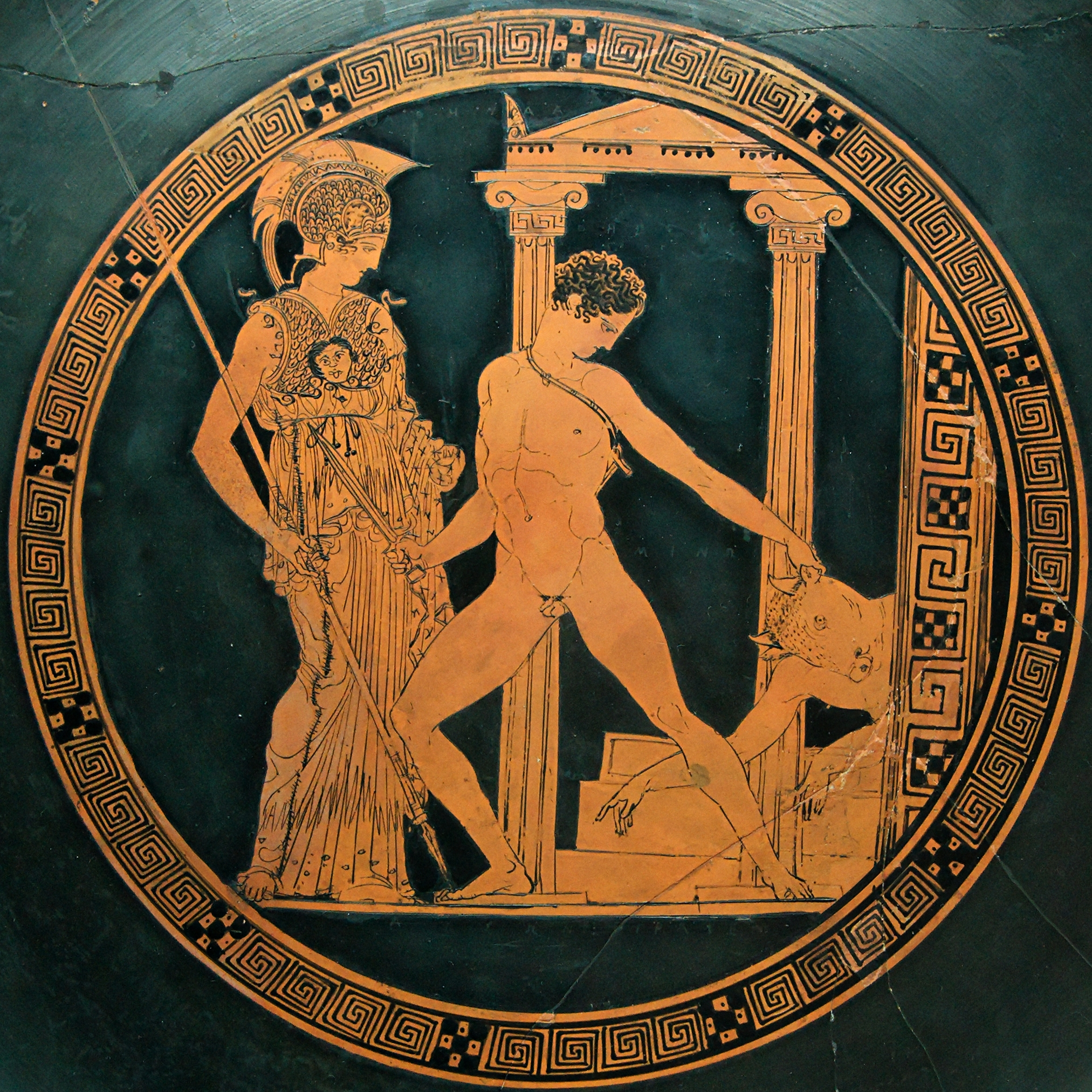
Tondo showing the victory of Theseus over the Minotaur in the presence of Athena from c. 435 BC

All the stories agree that prince Androgeus, son of King Minos, died and that the fault lay with the Athenians. The sacrifice of young Athenian men and women was a penalty for his death.

In some versions he was killed by the Athenians because of their jealousy of the victories he had won at the Panathenaic Games; in others he was killed at Marathon by the Cretan Bull, his mother's former taurine lover, because Aegeus, king of Athens, had commanded Androgeus to slay it. The common tradition holds that Minos waged a war of revenge for the death of his son, and won. The consequence of Athens losing the war was the regular sacrifice of several of their youths and maidens. Pausanias's account of the myth said that Minos had led a fleet against Athens and simply harassed the Athenians until they had agreed to send children as sacrifices. In his account of the Minotaur's birth, Catullus refers to yet another version in which Athens was "compelled by the cruel plague to pay penalties for the killing of Androgeon". To avert a plague caused by divine retribution for the Cretan prince's death, Aegeus had to send into the Labyrinth "young men at the same time as the best of unwed girls as a feast" for the Minotaur. Some accounts declare that Minos required seven Athenian youths and seven maidens, chosen by lots, to be sent every seventh year (or ninth); some versions say every year.

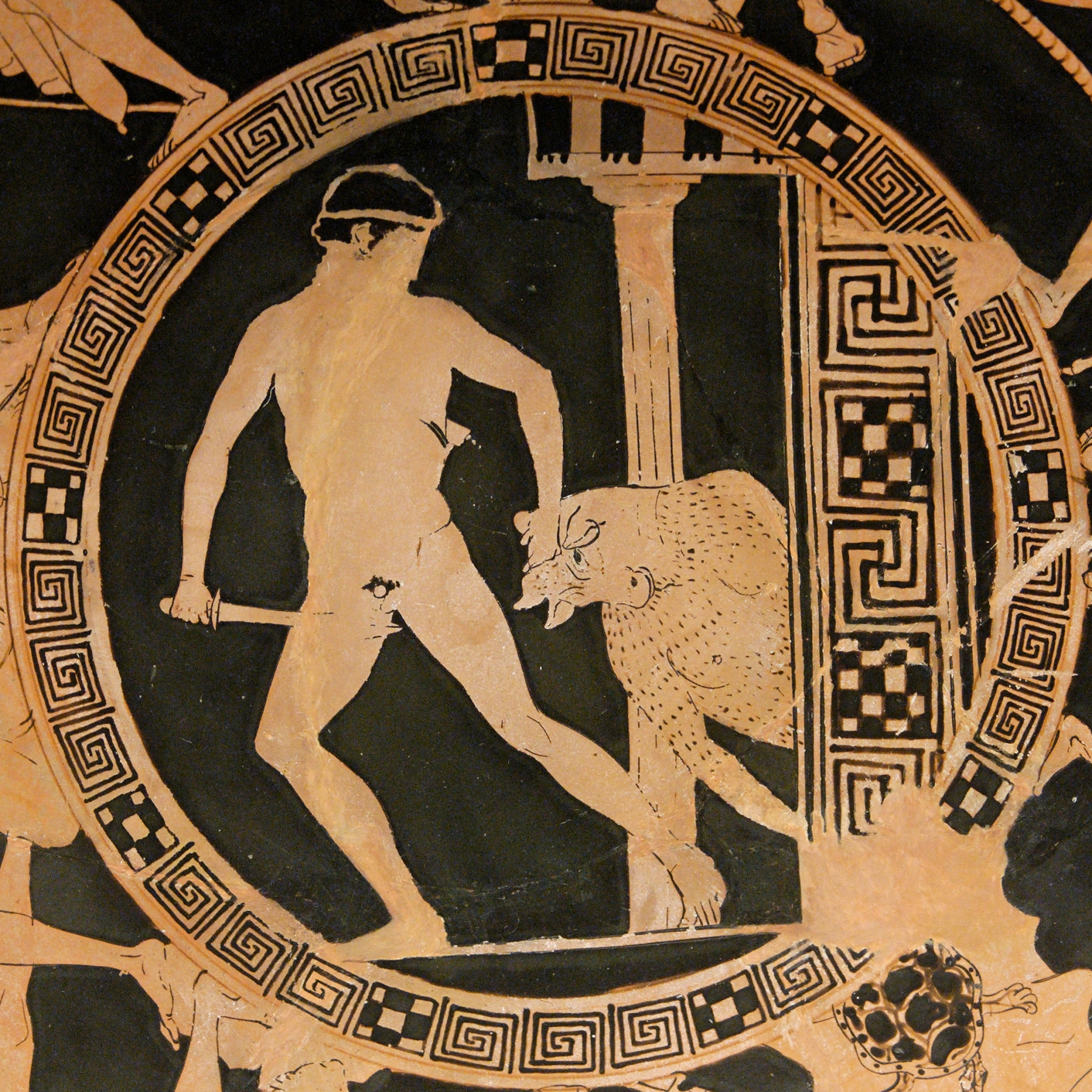
Theseus dragging the Minotaur out of the Labyrinth, red-figure kylix from c. 440–430 BC

When the time for the third sacrifice approached, the Athenian prince Theseus volunteered to slay the Minotaur. Isocrates orates that Theseus thought that he would rather die than rule a city that paid a tribute of children's lives to their enemy. He promised his father Aegeus that he would change the somber black sail of the boat carrying the victims from Athens to Crete, and put up a white sail for his return journey if he was successful; the crew would leave up the black sail if he was killed.

In Crete, Minos's daughter Ariadne fell madly in love with Theseus and helped him navigate the Labyrinth. In most accounts she gave him a ball of thread, allowing him to retrace his path. According to various classical sources and representations, Theseus killed the Minotaur with his sword, a club, or his bare hands. He then led the Athenians out of the Labyrinth, and they sailed with Ariadne away from Crete. On the way home, Theseus abandoned Ariadne on the island of Naxos and continued to Athens. The returning group neglected to replace the black sail with the promised white sail, and from his lookout on Cape Sounion, King Aegeus saw the black-sailed ship approach. Presuming his son dead, he killed himself by leaping into the sea that is since named after him. His death secured the throne for Theseus.

== Interpretations ==
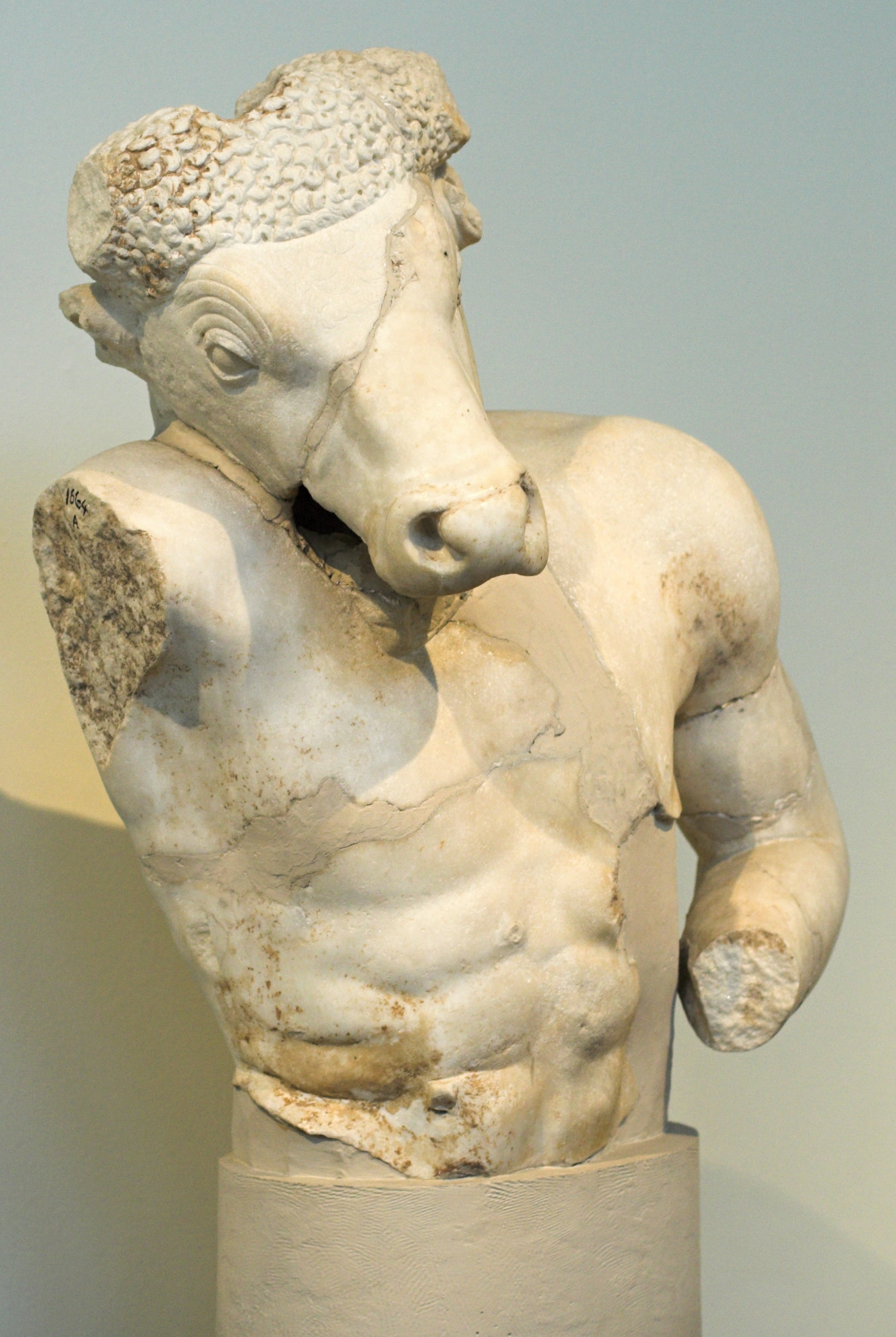
Statue of the Minotaur (Roman copy of an original by Myron), National Archaeological Museum, Athens

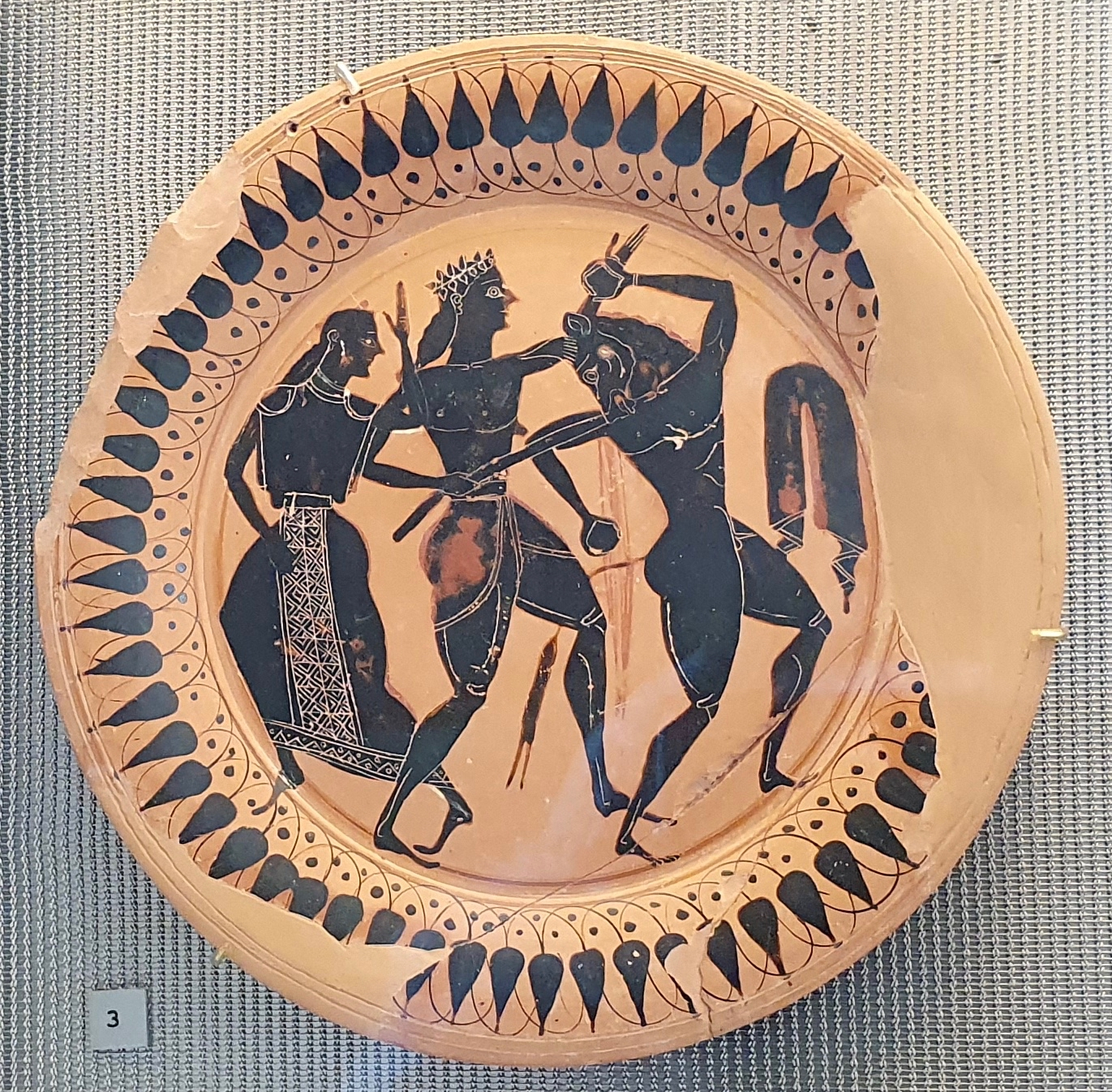
Theseus wrestling with the Minotaur in the presence of Ariadne, c. 550–540 BC

The contest between Theseus and the Minotaur was frequently represented in Greek art. A Knossian didrachm exhibits on one side the Labyrinth, on the other the Minotaur surrounded by a semicircle of small balls, probably intended for stars; one of the monster's names was Asterion or Asterius ("star").

Pasiphaë gave birth to Asterius, who was called the Minotaur. He had the face of a bull, but the rest of him was human; and Minos, in compliance with certain oracles, shut him up and guarded him in the Labyrinth.

While the ruins of Minos's palace at Knossos were discovered, the Labyrinth never was. The multiplicity of rooms, staircases and corridors in the palace has led some archaeologists to suggest that the palace itself was the source of the Labyrinth myth, with over 1300 maze-like compartments, an idea that is now generally discredited. (Note: Sir Arthur Evans, the first of many archaeologists who have worked at Knossos, is often given credit for this idea, but he did not believe it; modern scholarship generally discounts the idea.) Homer, describing the shield of Achilles, remarked that Daedalus had constructed a ceremonial dancing ground for Ariadne, but does not associate this with the term labyrinth.

Some 19th century mythologists proposed that the Minotaur was a personification of the sun and a Minoan adaptation of the Baal-Moloch of the Phoenicians. The slaying of the Minotaur by Theseus in that case could be interpreted as a memory of Athens breaking tributary relations with Minoan Crete.

According to A. B. Cook, Minos and Minotaur were different forms of the same personage, representing the sun-god of the Cretans, who depicted the sun as a bull. He and J. G. Frazer both explain Pasiphaë's union with the bull as a sacred ceremony, at which the queen of Knossos was wedded to a bull-formed god, just as the wife of the Tyrant in Athens was wedded to Dionysus. E. Pottier, who does not dispute the historical personality of Minos, in view of the story of Phalaris, considers it probable that in Crete (where a bull cult may have existed by the side of that of the labrys) victims were tortured by being shut up in the belly of a red-hot brazen bull. The story of Talos, the Cretan man of brass, who heated himself red-hot and clasped strangers in his embrace as soon as they landed on the island, is probably of similar origin.

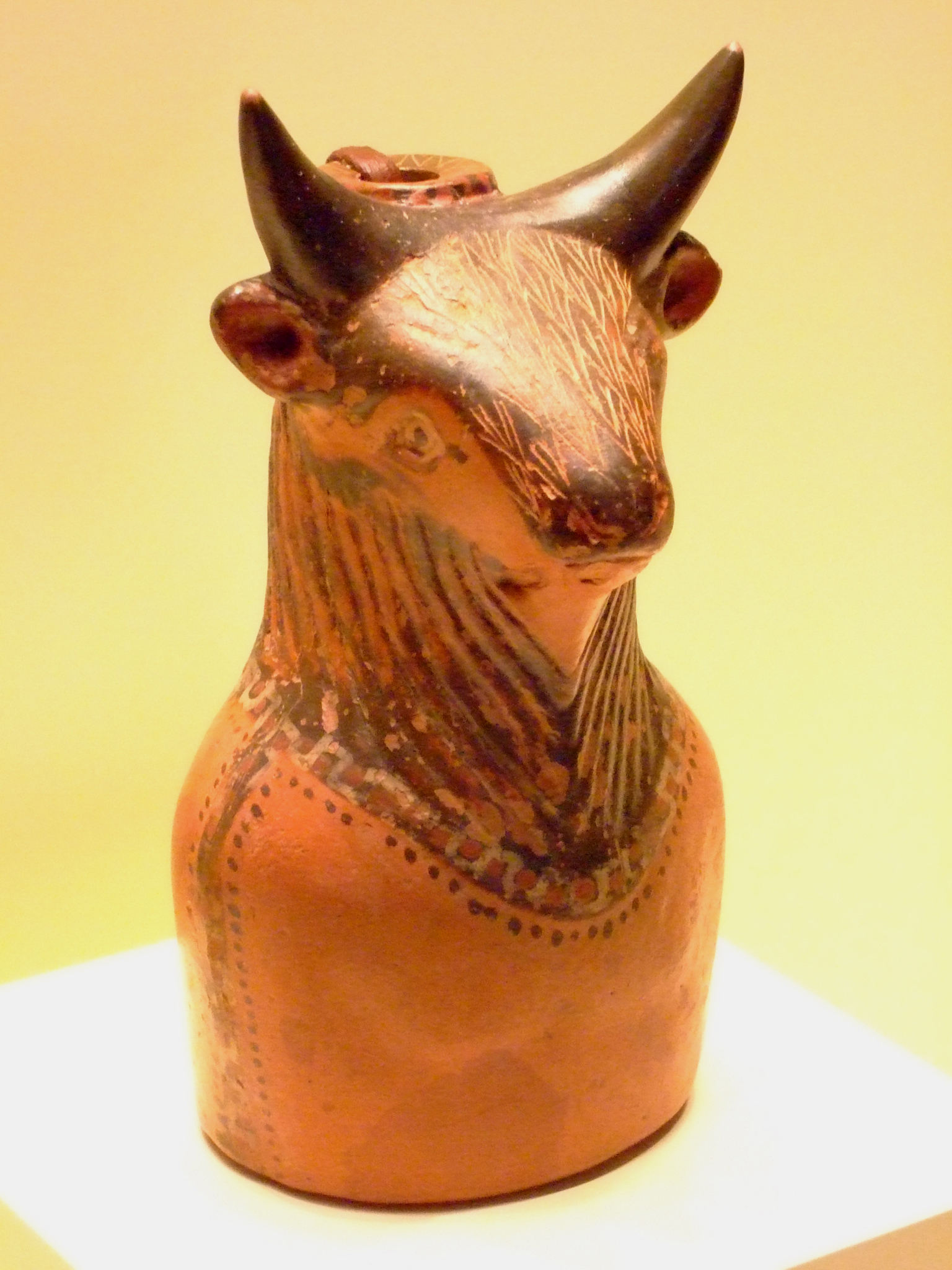
Ionian perfume jar in the shape of a minotaur

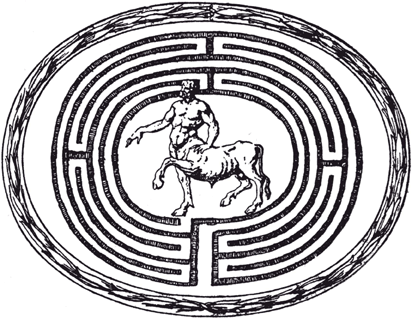
The Minotaur in the Labyrinth, engraving of a 16th-century AD gem in the Medici Collection in the Palazzo Strozzi, Florence (Note: Paolo Alessandro Maffei (1709), Gemmae Antiche, Pt. IV, pl. 31; Kern (2000): Maffei "erroneously deemed the piece to be from Classical antiquity".)

Kerényi Károly viewed the Minotaur, or Asterios, as a god associated with stars, comparable to Dionysus. Coins minted at Knossos from the fifth century showed labyrinth patterns encircling a goddess's head crowned with a wreath of grain, a bull's head, or a star. Kerényi argued that the star in the Labyrinth was in fact Asterios, making the Minotaur a "luminous" deity in Crete, associated with a goddess known as the Mistress of the Labyrinth.

=== Image gallery ===
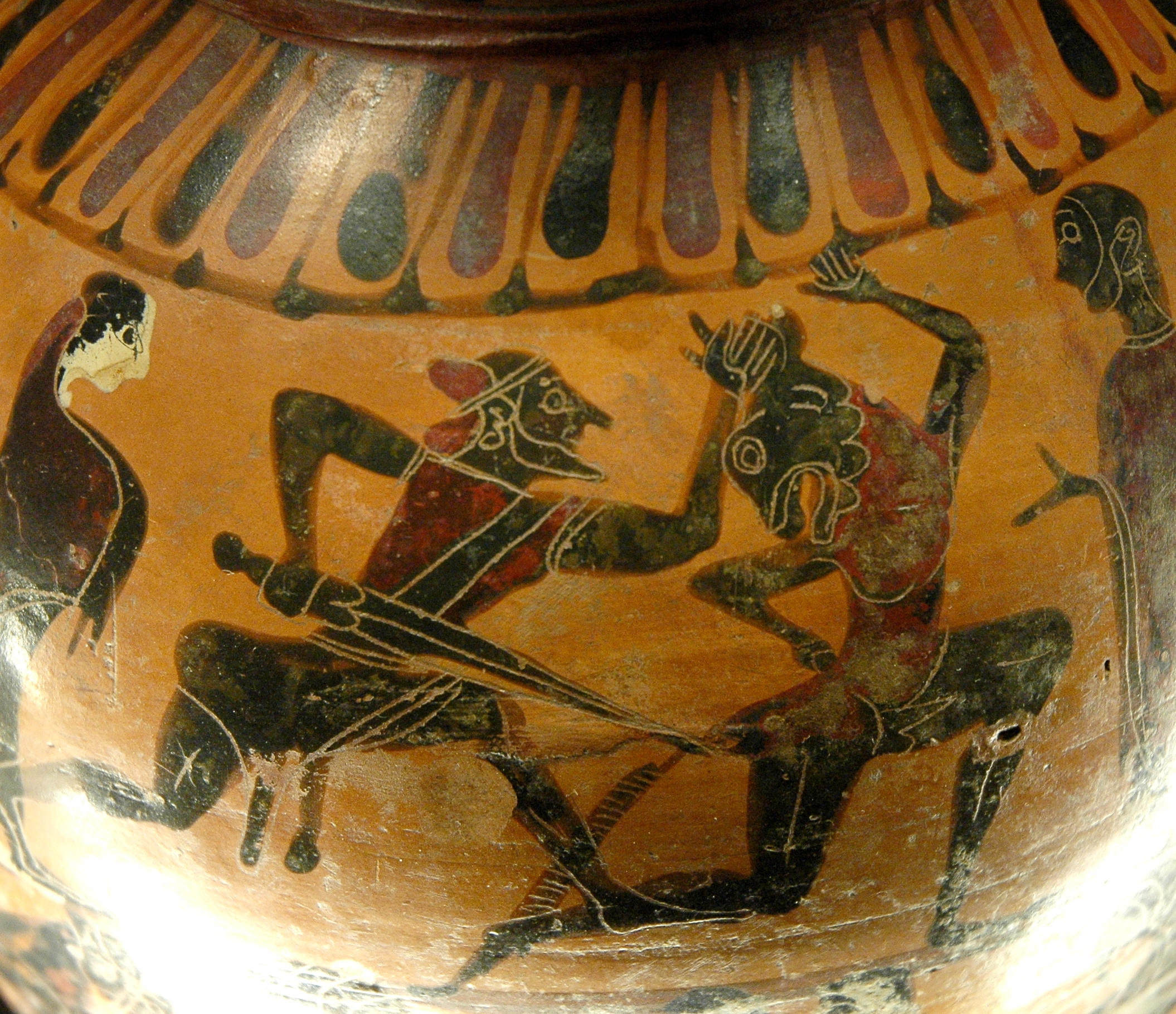
Theseus and the Minotaur; detail from an Attic black-figure amphora, c. 575–550 BC

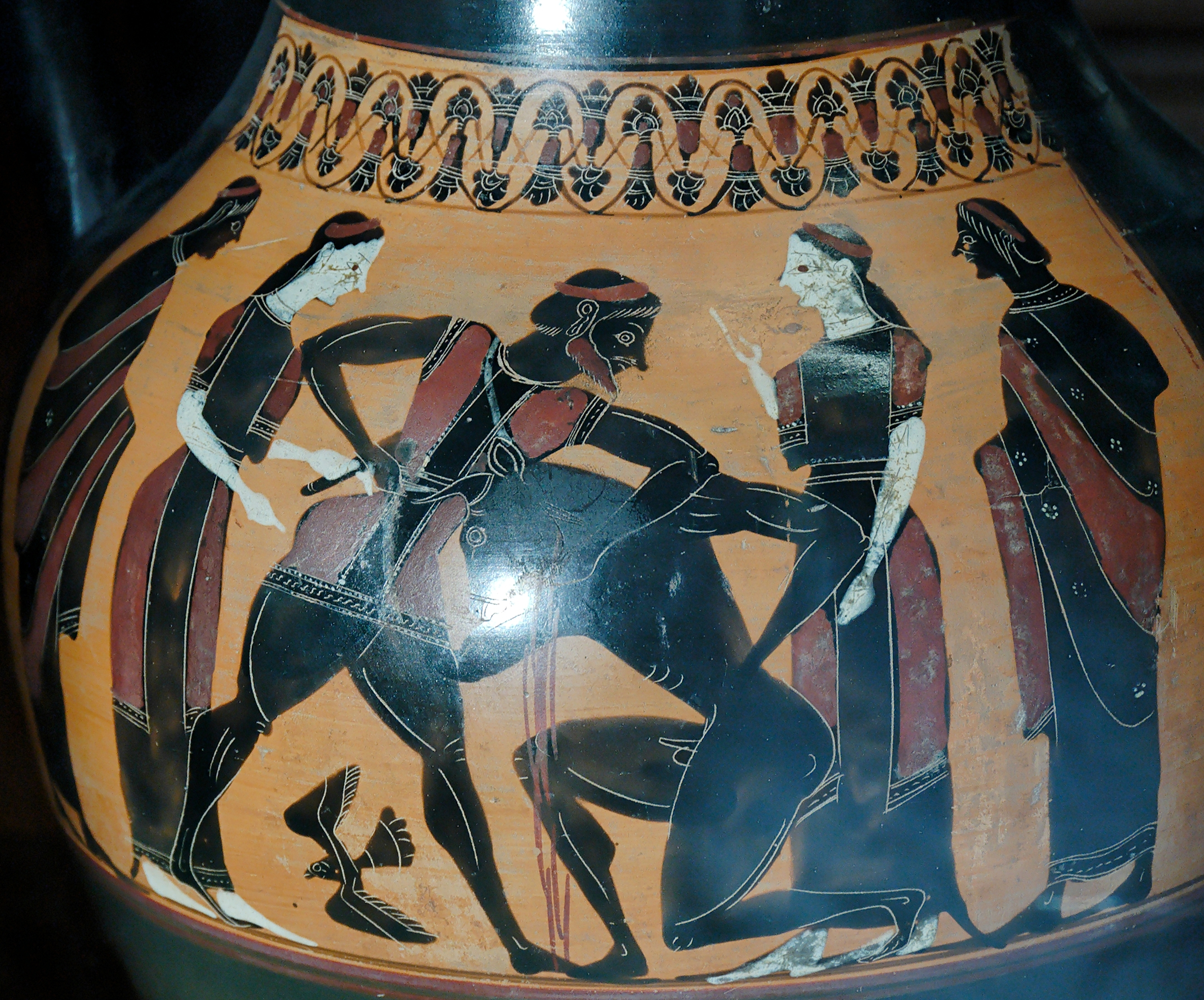
Theseus and the Minotaur; side A from a black-figure Attic amphora, c. 540 BC

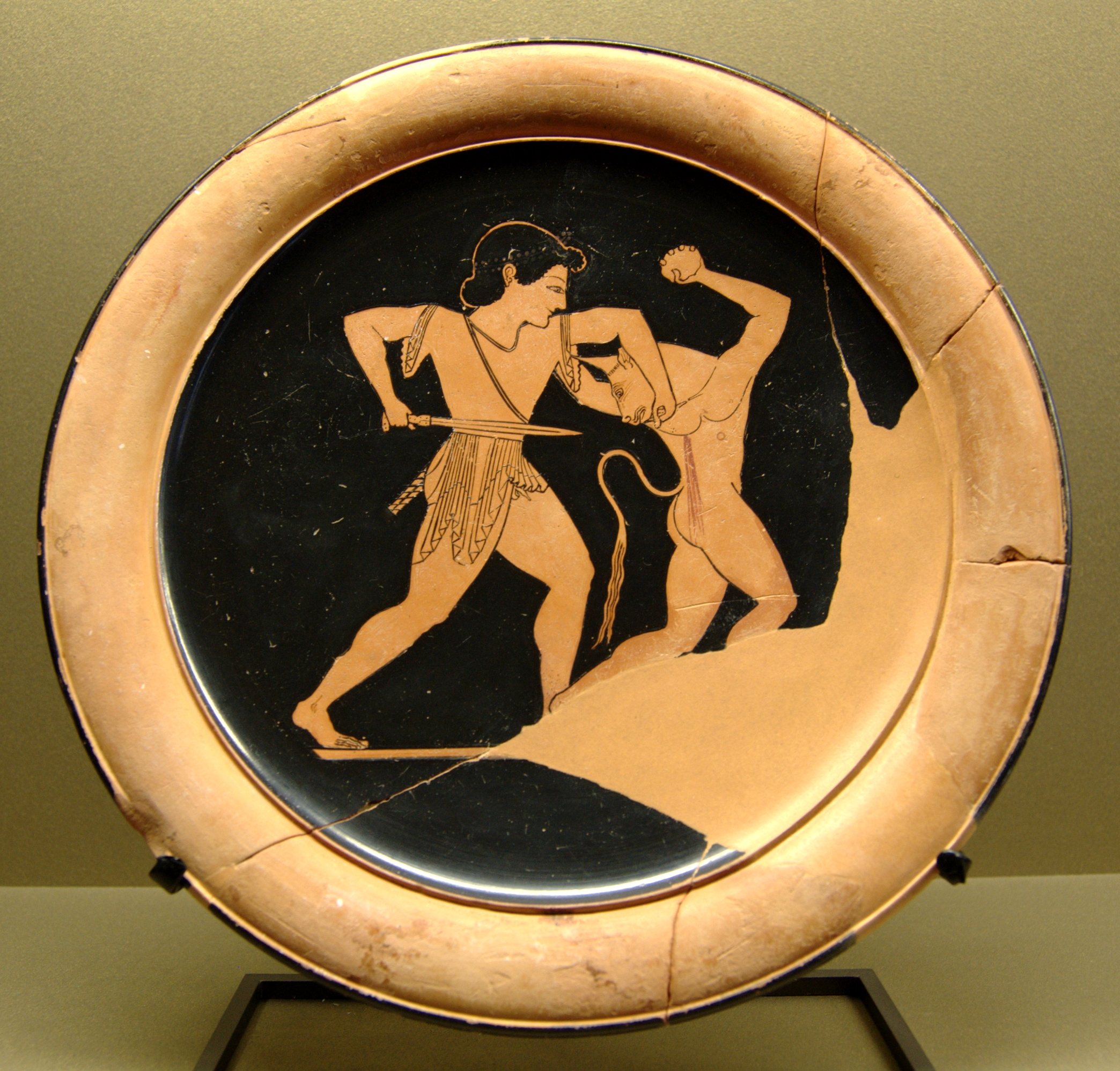
Theseus and the Minotaur; Attic red-figured plate, 520–510 BC

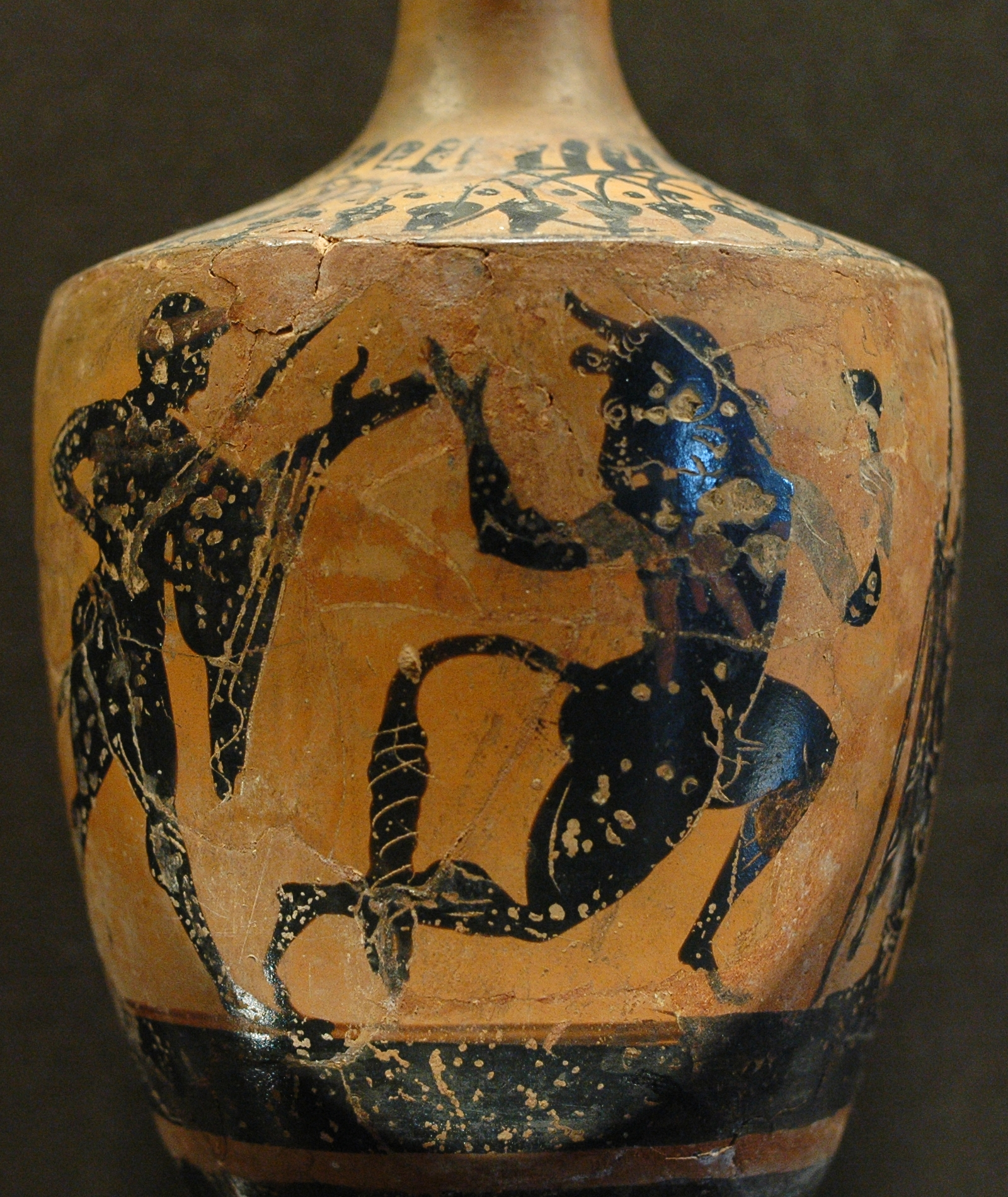
Theseus and the Minotaur; Attic black-figure lekythos, 500–475 BC, from Crimea

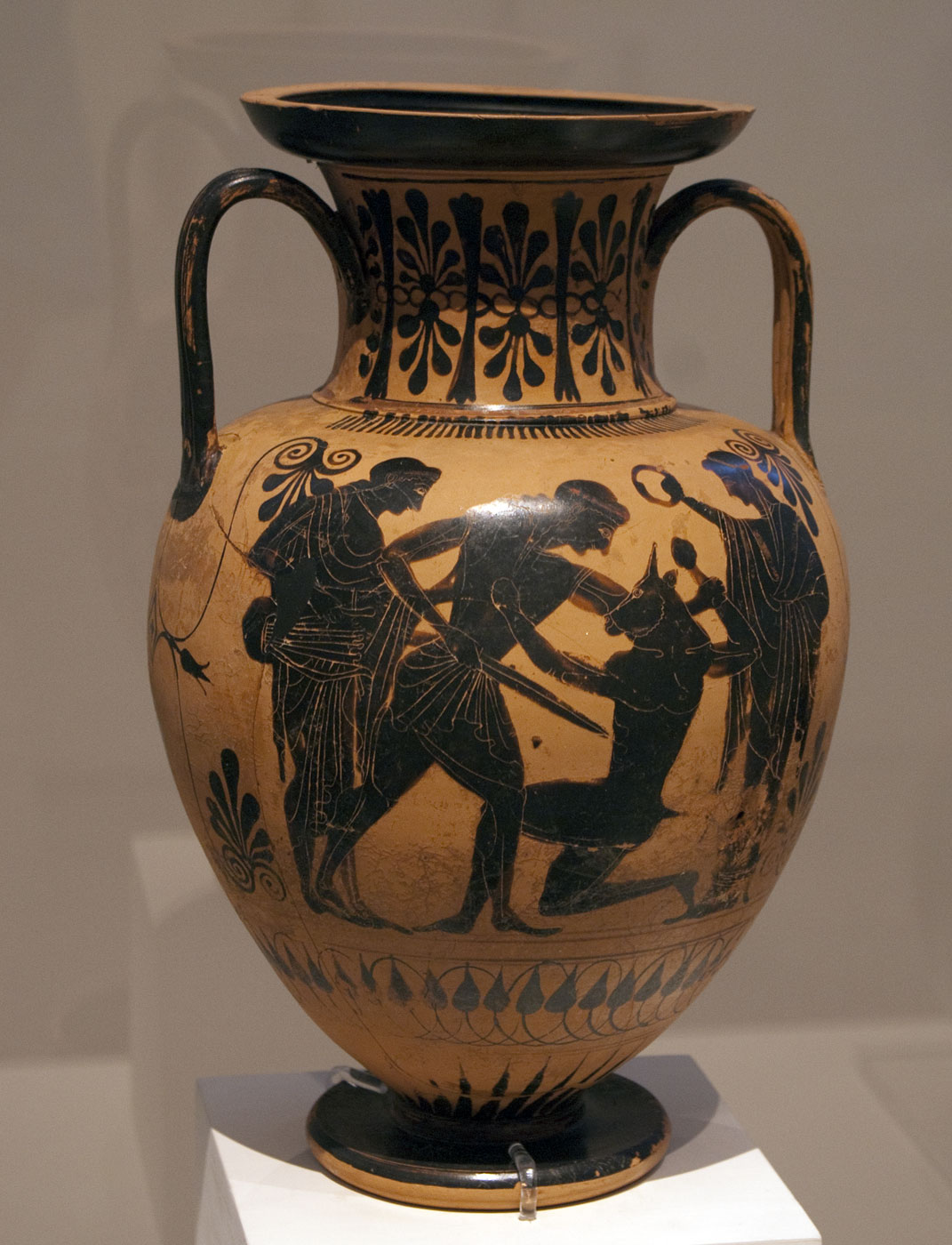
Theseus and the Minotaur; black-figure amphora c. 480 BC

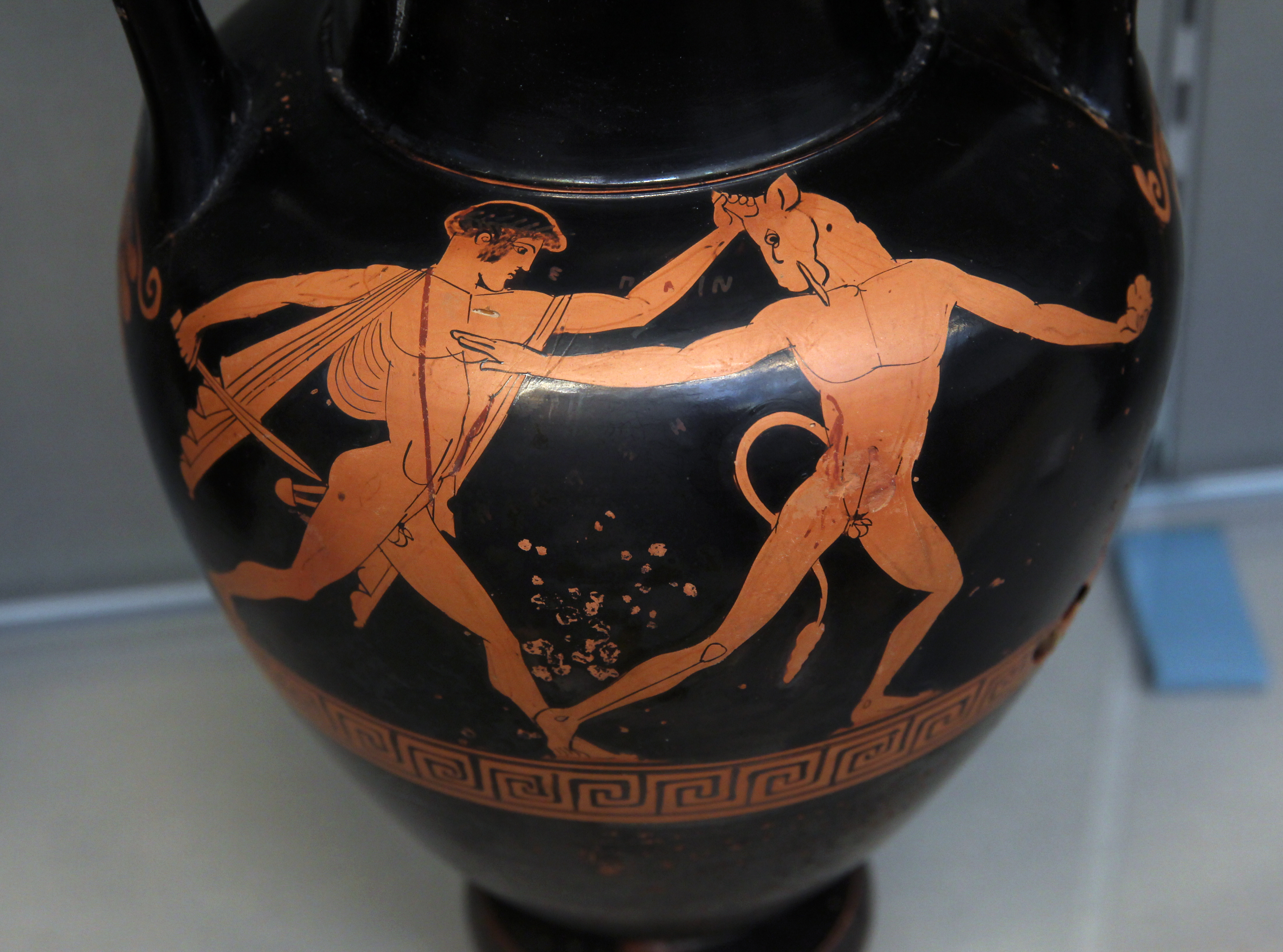
Theseus fighting the Minotaur; red-figure amphora, c. 460 BC

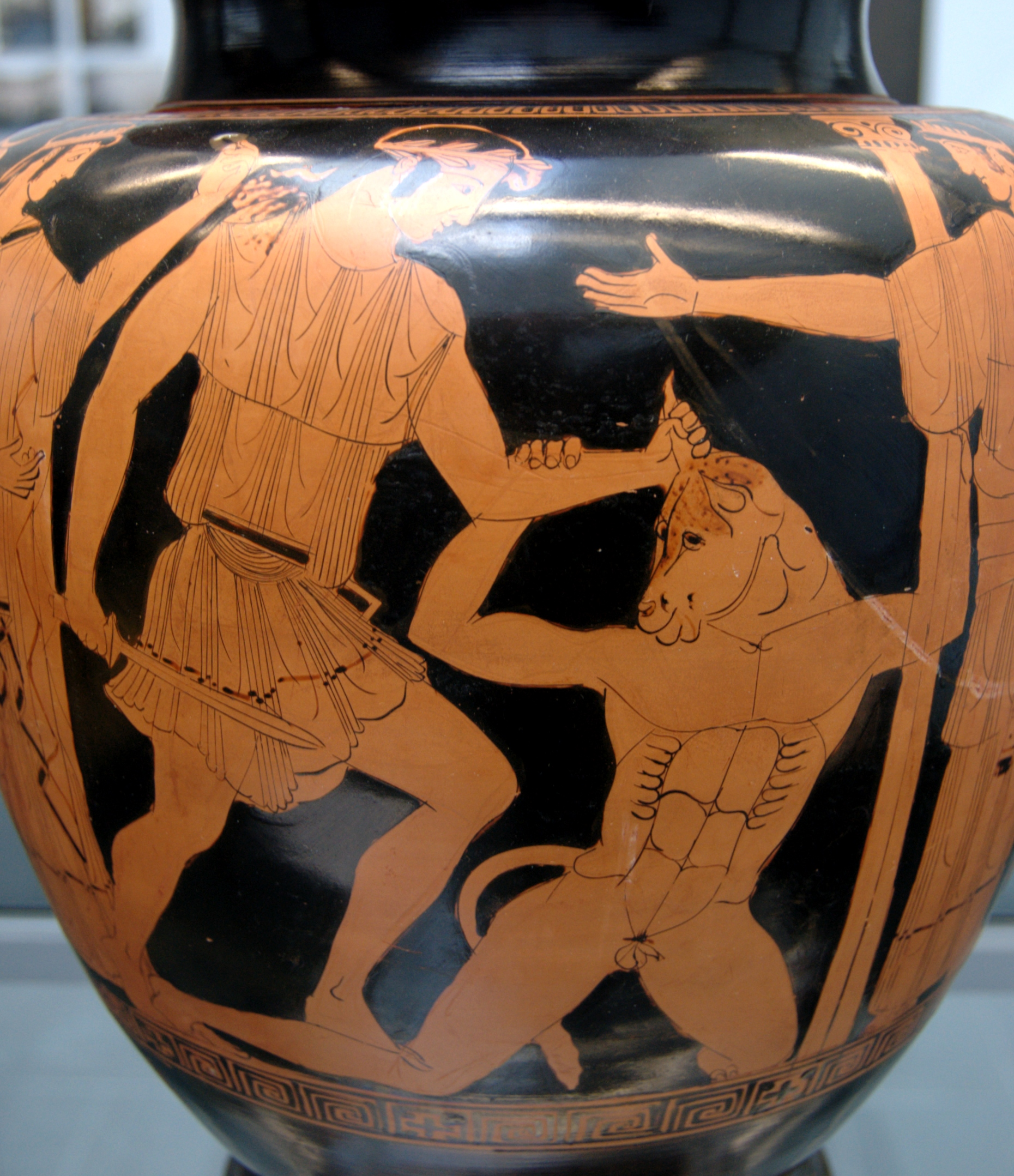
Theseus and the Minotaur; side A from an Attic red-figure stamnos, c. 460 BC

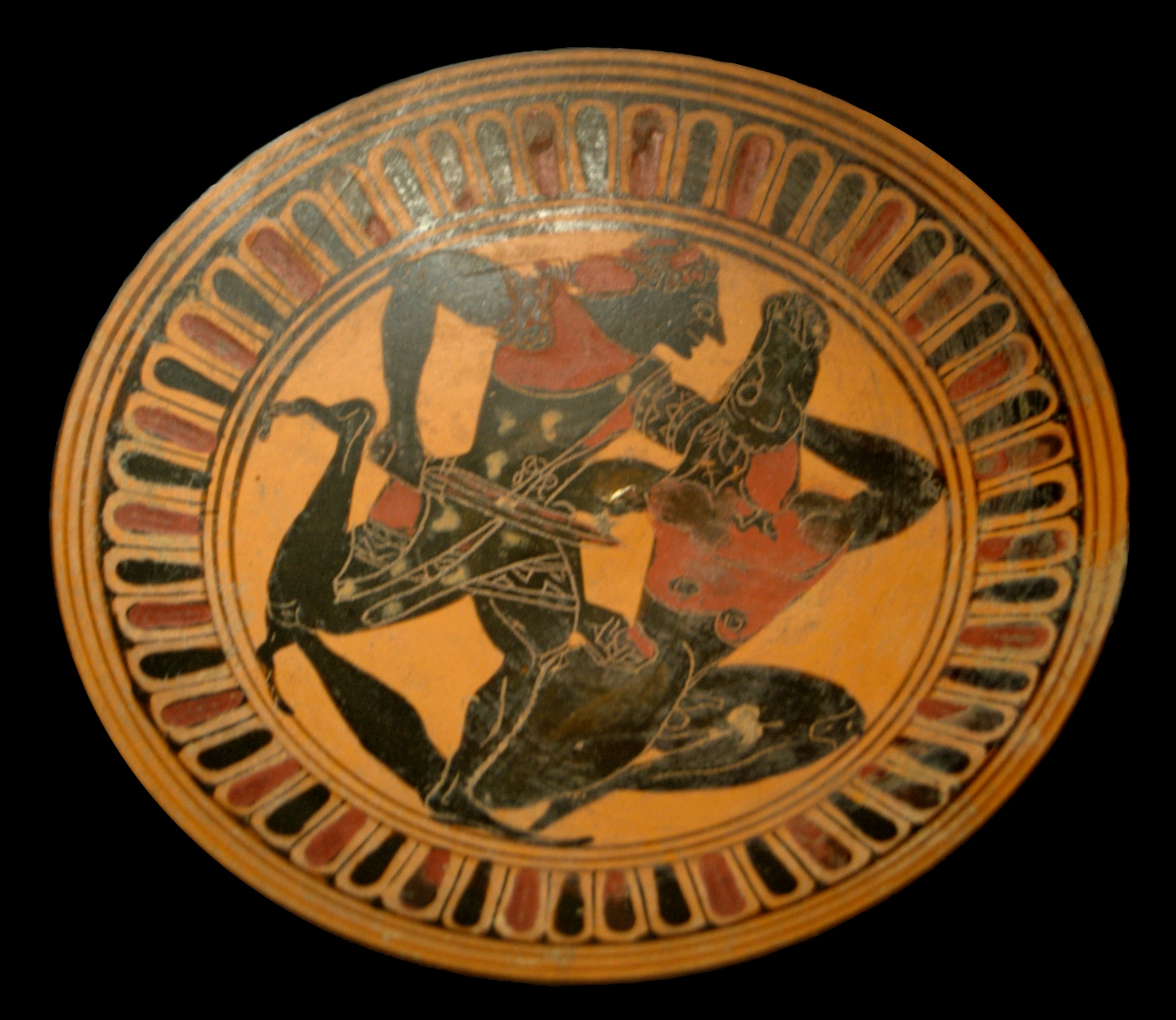
Theseus and the Minotaur; Attic black-figure kylix tondo, c. 450–440 BC

== References in media ==
=== Dante's Inferno ===
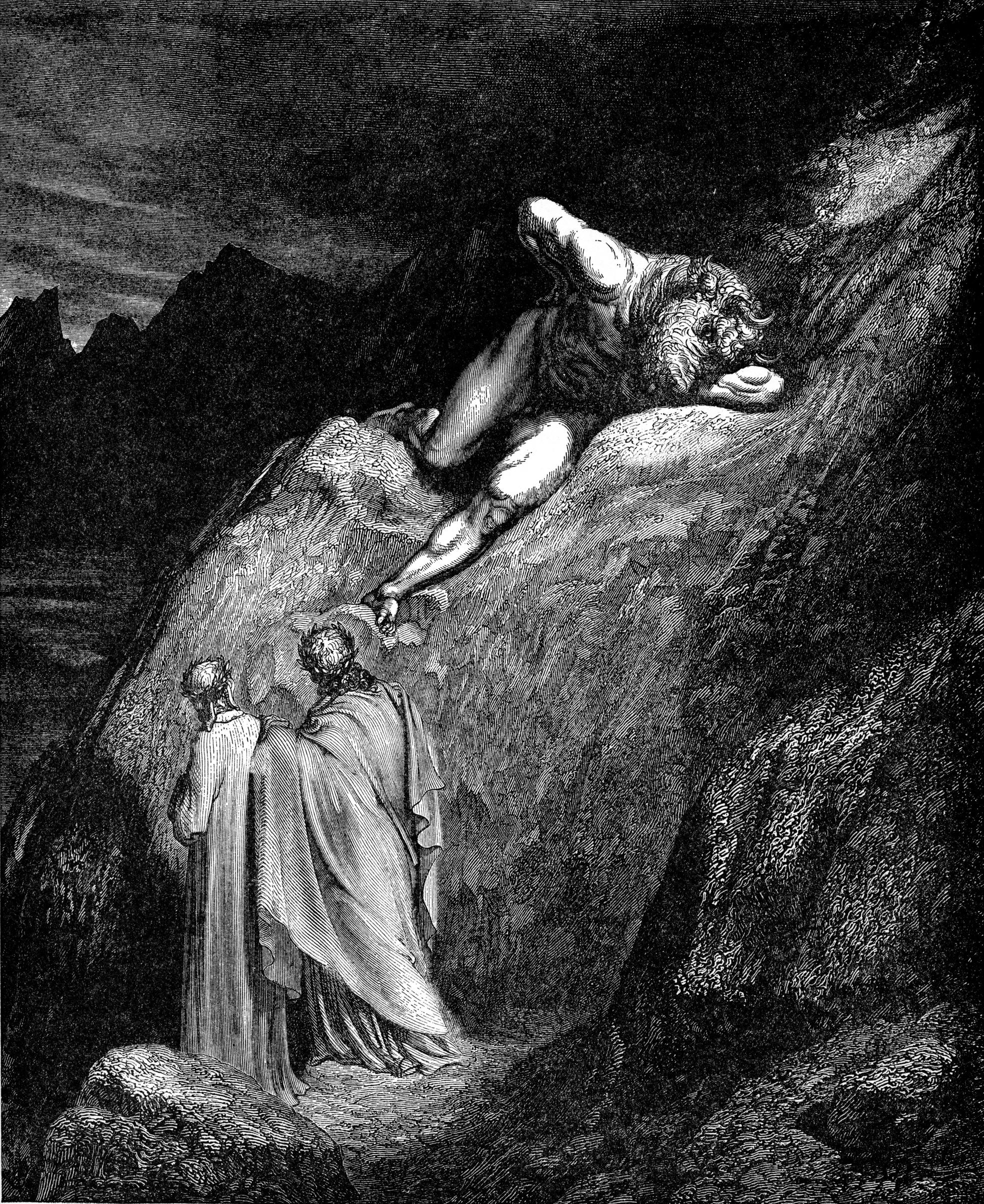
Dante and Virgil meet the Minotaur, illustration by Gustave Doré

The Minotaur (infamia di Creti, Italian for 'infamy of Crete'), appears briefly in Dante's Inferno, in Canto 12 (l. 12–13, 16–21), where Dante and his guide Virgil find themselves picking their way among boulders dislodged on the slope and preparing to enter into the seventh circle of hell. Dante and Virgil encounter the beast first among the "men of blood": those damned for their violent natures. Some commentators believe that Dante, in a reversal of classical tradition, bestowed the beast with a man's head upon a bull's body, though this representation had already appeared in the Middle Ages.

Lo savio mio inver' lui gridò: "Forse
tu credi che qui sia 'l duca d'Atene,
che sú nel mondo la morte ti porse?
Pártiti, bestia, ché questi non vene
ammaestrato da la tua sorella,
ma vassi per veder la vostre pene."

— Inferno, Canto XII, lines 16–20
Translation:

My sage cried out to him: "You think,
perhaps, this is the Duke of Athens,
who in the world put you to death.
Get away, you beast, for this man
does not come tutored by your sister;
he comes to view your punishments."

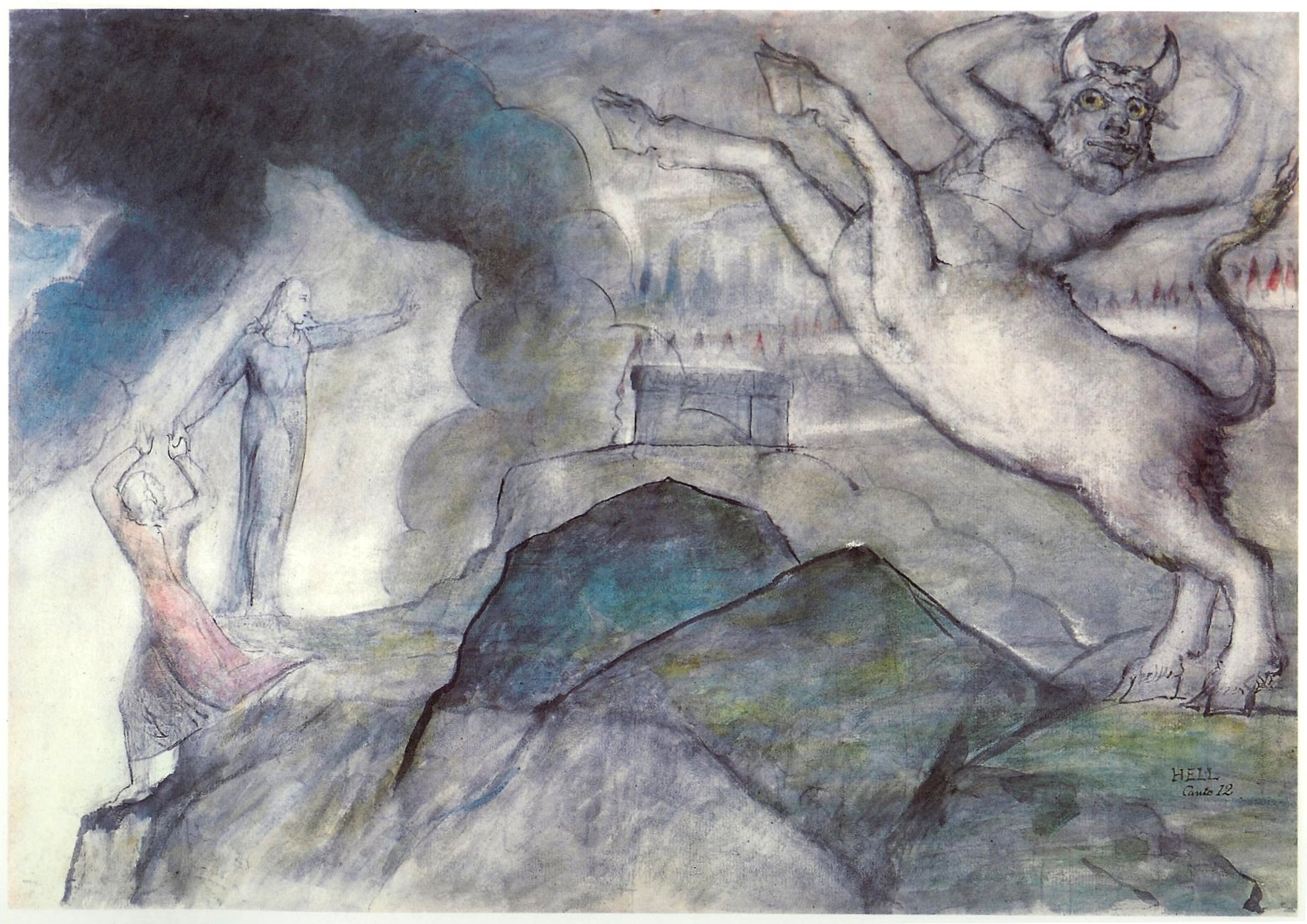
William Blake's image of the Minotaur to illustrate Inferno XII

In these lines, Virgil taunts the Minotaur to distract him, and reminds the Minotaur that he was killed by Theseus the Duke of Athens with the help of the monster's half-sister Ariadne. The Minotaur is the first infernal guardian whom Virgil and Dante encounter within the walls of Dis. (Note: The fallen angels, the Erinyes [Furies], and the unseen Medusa were located on the City of Dis's defensive ramparts.) The Minotaur seems to represent the entire zone of Violence, much as Geryon represents Fraud in Canto XVI, and serves a similar role as gatekeeper for the entire seventh Circle.

Giovanni Boccaccio writes of the Minotaur in his literary commentary of the Commedia: "When he had grown up and become a most ferocious animal, and of incredible strength, they tell that Minos had him shut up in a prison called the labyrinth, and that he had sent to him there all those whom he wanted to die a cruel death". Dante Gabriel Rossetti, in his own commentary, compares the Minotaur with all three sins of violence within the seventh circle: "The Minotaur, who is situated at the rim of the tripartite circle, fed, according to the poem was biting himself (violence against one's body) and was conceived in the 'false cow' (violence against nature, daughter of God)."

Virgil and Dante then pass quickly by to the centaurs (Nessus, Chiron and Pholus) who guard the Flegetonte ("river of blood"), to continue through the seventh Circle.

=== Visual art ===
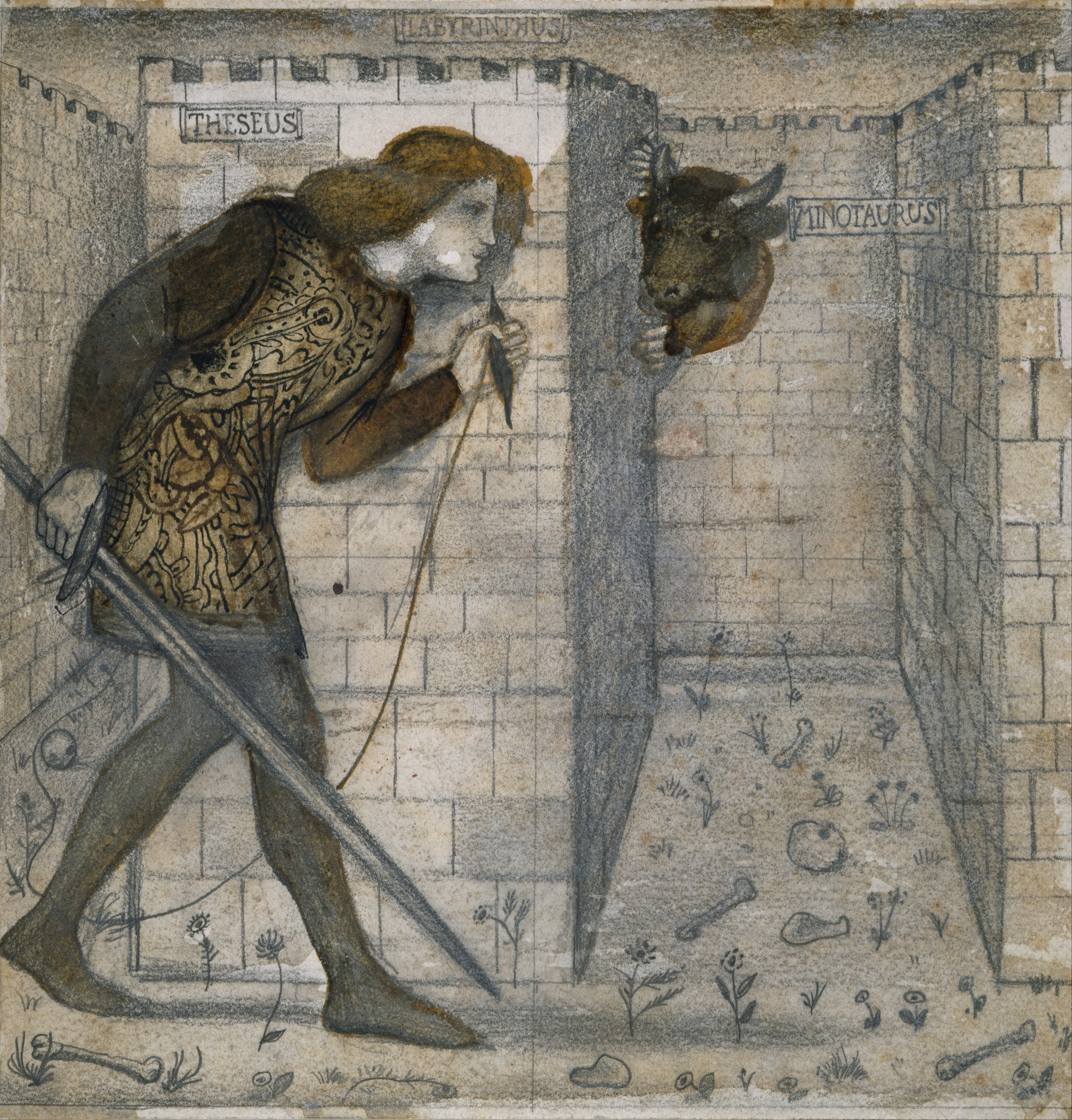
Edward Burne-Jones's illustration of Theseus and the Minotaur in the Labyrinth, 1861

- Pablo Picasso made a series of etchings in the Vollard Suite showing the Minotaur being tormented, possibly inspired also by Spanish bullfighting.

=== Literature and plays ===
- Nathanial Hawthorne wrote short story, The Minotaur in 1918.
- The Chronicles of Narnia story The Lion, the Witch and the Wardrobe features a race of Minotaurs that are among the creatures on the White Witch's side.
- The Minotaur is a recurring character in Rick Riordan's Camp Half-Blood Chronicles (2005–present).
- Argentine author Julio Cortázar published the play Los reyes (The Kings) in 1949, which reinterprets the Minotaur's story. In the book, Ariadne is not in love with Theseus, but with her brother the Minotaur.
- The short story "The House of Asterion" by the Argentine writer Jorge Luis Borges gives the Minotaur's story from the monster's perspective.
  - The 2000 novel House of Leaves, by American writer Mark Z. Danielewski, contains numerous references to Borges and "The House of Asterion", including a chapter, titled "The Minotaur", that opens with a quote from Borges and presents a sympathetic interpretation of the Minotaur.
- Asterion is the chief antagonist of The King Must Die, Mary Renault's 1958 reinterpretation of the Theseus myth in the light of the excavation of Knossos.
- The Minotaur Takes a Cigarette Break, a 2000 novel, centers around the Minotaur as a character living in the modern-day Southern United States.
- Harrison Birtwistle and David Harsent's opera, The Minotaur.

=== Film ===
- Minotaur, the Wild Beast of Crete, a 1960 Italian film directed by Silvio Amadio and starring Bob Mathias as Theseus.
- Minotaur, a horror adaptation of the legend starring Tom Hardy as Theo (Theseus), was released on DVD by Lions Gate in 2006.
- In Immortals, a 2011 American film directed by Tarsem Singh, Minotaur is the tallest and most dangerous warrior of Hyperion, depicted as a regular man wearing a helmet in the form of bull's head.
- In the 2026 Russian film Minotaur, a plot line is the requirement for a modern-day business owner to identify 14 employees to be given over to the draft, for service in the Russo-Ukrainian war.

=== Video games and role-playing games ===
- The fantasy role-playing game Dungeons & Dragons features minotaurs as opponents, where they "retain the connotation of 'man' degraded into 'beast'" of their traditional counterparts, but also as playable characters, translated from the singular creature of legend into a species.
- In the 2018 action-adventure game Assassin's Creed Odyssey, the Minotaur is a legendary creature to be defeated in a boss fight. In a series of missions various references are made to the mythical history of the Minotaur, like Theseus and the thread of Ariadne.

== See also ==
- Kao (bull) – a legendary chaotic bull in Meitei mythology, similar to Minotaur in character
- Minotauria – a genus of woodlouse hunting spiders endemic to the Balkans
- Ox-Head and Horse-Face – two guardians or types of guardians of the underworld in Chinese mythology
- Satyr – a legendary human–horse (later human–goat) hybrid
- Shedu – a figure in Mesopotamian mythology with the body of a bull and a human head
- Theseus and the Minotaur – a logic game that is inspired by the myth of Theseus and the Minotaur in the Labyrinth.
