= Amon Liner =

American writer

- Born: Amon George Liner; May 29, 1940; Charlotte, North Carolina, U.S.
- Died: July 26, 1976 (aged 36)
- Education: Kenyon College (BA); University of North Carolina at Chapel Hill (MA); University of North Carolina at Greensboro (MFA)

Amon George Liner (May 29, 1940 – July 26, 1976) was an American poet and playwright.

== Early life and education ==
Amon Liner was born in Charlotte, North Carolina. He received a Bachelor of Arts degree in English from Kenyon College, and was elected to Phi Beta Kappa. He received a Master of Arts in drama from the University of North Carolina at Chapel Hill, where he was a member of the Dialectic Society. He also completed a Master of Fine Arts in creative writing from the University of North Carolina at Greensboro. He edited poetry for the Red Clay Reader, and was a book reviewer for The Charlotte Observer.

== Career ==
A severe congenital heart defect limited his physical exertion, and led to his death soon after the appearance of his second published work. The majority of his work was published posthumously by his friend and editor Judy Hogan of Carolina Wren Press. The Greensboro Review awards an Amon Liner poetry prize. In 2000, the Asheville Poetry Review named him one of 10 Great Neglected Poets of the 20th Century.

Liner was associated with a group of fellow poets, including Fred Chappell and Tom Huey. Liner's work especially embraces the relationships between artifacts and their creators. In an interview in the "New Voices" series produced by WUNC, Liner humorously contrasted himself with the "druidism" of poets who seemed to celebrate only uninhabited nature. Rather, he delighted in the poetic possibilities of technology, whether rusted cars, computers, or armaments. He never hesitated to demand of his readers a comprehensive knowledge of history, language, science and engineering. While recognizing the sometimes sad consequences of human creations, his tone was most often mischievous or contemplative.

The most monumental of Liner's work is the two volume The Far Journey and Final End of Dr. Faustwitz, Spaceman. Discovering immortality in the midst of a Nazi death camp, Dr. Faustwitz sets out to avenge evil by killing God. To amass power towards that end, Faustwitz gathers a crew for a journey through space, collecting wisdom from one planet after another. Through this journey, Liner explores every aspect of sense, conscience, science, technology, culture, language and nature to delve even more deeply into humanity than into the depths of space. The work is dense in language and wide-ranging in its themes.

Liner's papers are archived at the UNC-Chapel Hill Southern Historical Collection.

== Works ==
- Marstower (1972) Red Clay Publishers
  - Contents: Auschwitz & Other Artifacts
    - To Pythias from His Old Friend Damon
    - Morning Stroll
    - These, She Said, Are the Latter Times
    - Within The Interval
    - Too Many Eggs in the Quicksand
    - Sleepwalk Voyage to the Crystal Land, the Golden Shores
    - Don Juan Looks Back Upon Lot's Wife
    - Divertimenti 22
    - Towards a Definition of Pain
    - Crucifixion Cube, Pre-Cubist
  - Darkside of the Sun
    - True Love Endures Through the Ages
    - Statues Meeting
    - Painblanket, Two Rows
    - Micro/Meso/Macro Cosmology
    - The Death of Meat
    - Clocks, Squares, Fetuses & Glory Hands
    - The Time Lag Between Blue and White
    - God-Clone
    - Desire Is Tonk
    - Painting of Block-Style Sculpture
    - Ode for the Blue Fox
    - Time; or, The Philosophy of Silver & Yellow
    - The Children of Ferocity
    - "For Man, Love is Part of Life; But for Woman, Love Is the Whole of Life"
    - Dirge for Ecumenical Liberalism
    - Dirge for Poetic Liberalism
    - Dirge for National Liberalism
    - Dirge for Secular Reality
    - Creativity, the Theosophy of the Film Critics
  - Boswash
- Chrome Grass: Poems of Love and Burial (1975) Carolina Wren Press, Library of Congress Catalog Number 76-8750
  - Contents: Preface
  - Explanation of 4-Ply Format
  - From the Depths of Pastoral Love
  - Hero & the Lady / I
  - Hero & the Lady / II
  - Hero & the Lady / III
  - Hero & the Lady / IV
  - Television Love
  - Climax!
  - LoveLove; or, The Hope of Things To Come
  - Exotic Nostalgia Love
  - Love Assemblage
  - PainLust; or, Elegy for the White Hats and Their Preferred Operational Mode of Love
  - DeathDeath; or, The Love of Objects Objectified
  - Burial Rites / I
  - Burial Rites / II
  - Burial Rites / III
- Rose, A Color of Darkness (1980) Carolina Wren Press ISBN 0-932112-09-9
  - Contents: Rose, A Color of Darkness
    - Review of a Conceptual Art Exhibition
    - A Mondrian Poem On the Decline and fall of Greece, Chile, Brazil, Amerika, the Weimar Republic and the Language of Pellucidar
    - Easy Wishes, Or the Old Nag Won't Go No More
    - Accounting Autumn
    - Live & Still Life
    - There Is A Place To Go, I Feel
    - Trying To Sail Beyond the Map
    - Things That Are True of Blue
    - Homage to Magritte
    - Vergil's Finality: Voyage to the Center of July
    - A Statement of Fact
    - Why I Do Not Write Southern Poetry
    - A Meditation on Faust
    - On Being Shiftless
    - Divertimenti 24
    - Orpheus Again
    - True Grit Speechifies to Funky Midnight Rider
    - Gold Butter Won't Melt in the Golden Mouth
    - Bright Dark
    - Civic Religion
    - Scene from After ABM
    - Life Is Where You Find It
    - 20,000 Leagues Through the Peaceable Kingdom
    - Mixed Company
    - Inside the Belly of the Language
    - Beyond the Yellow Brick Road
    - Poets In the Age of Ford Or: All Maps and No Territory
    - Churchill in Heaven
    - Naked Singularity Routine
    - language is a never
    - death song
    - Rose, A Color of Darkness
  - Brief Historical Survey
    - Brief Historical Survey
    - Language: the Womb of Words
    - Brain Revolution
    - Polar Rhetoric: Star Death
    - 1975-1890
    - Ol' Cracker Barrel Linguistical Analysuh Smokes a Cob on Love
    - The Poem Is the Foundation of Its Language
    - Another Ego and Its Own
    - Game 3: A System Finding Game, With Subjectivities (As: History)
    - Nostalgia Reality
    - The Way of All Language
    - Project for Ecology Zero
    - And the Lst Shall be Bright
    - We Are the Children God Warned Nietzsche Against
    - A mirror which shall be nameless
    - Linear Poem 04 from the Meta Realm
    - Unbounded Direction Finding Game: or, Panopoly of the Machine Age
    - Riders of the Purple Language
    - Light Infantry Tactics
  - Poems From Notebooks 1974 – 1976
    - I do not know
    - The Proper Attitude Toward Death / Variations LXXIII
    - Mr. Smith Meets His Maker / Variations LXXXIX
    - Ode To What Flourishes / Variations XCIII
    - Lyric 1
    - Lyric 2
    - On the Power of Truth: a Parmenidean View
    - a poem about grandmother and Spring / Variations CXX
    - Variations CXXI
    - Directions for Contact / Variations CXXXIII
    - Lyric 7: Words For the Fathers
    - Love Is a Somehow Thing
    - The Age of Indifference: Part I / Variations CXLVI
    - Love and the Well-Worded Rose / New Variations 9
    - Parsifal & Co. / New Variations 11
    - Meditation On Essential Innocence / Variations CLXXI
    - A Pure Description / Variations CLXXII
    - Our Exciting Language & How It Grew / Variations CLXXIV
    - On Enlightened Detachment In An Impersonal Universe: or, How To Beat Inflation / Variations CLXXV
    - Coda / Variations CLXXVI
    - Variations CLXXIX
    - The Rational Description of Metaphor / Variations CLXXX
    - Ultimate Destination
    - Variations CLXXXIII
    - Variations CLXXXVI
    - What You See Is What There Is / Variations CLXXXV
    - Purity of Landscape / Variations CLXXXVII
- Dr. Faustwitz, Spaceman (1983) Carolina Wren Press, ISBN 0-932112-16-1
  - Contents: Book I: Faustwitz At Auschwitz
  - Book II: Immortality: Day One
  - Book III: Faustwitz & the Planet of Love
  - Book IV: Faustwitz & the Planet of Death
- Dr. Faustwitz, Spaceman (1988) Carolina Wren Press, ISBN 0-932112-19-6
  - Contents: Book V: Faustwitz Explorer
  - Book VI: Faustwitz Politician
  - Book VII: Faustwitz Conqueror
  - Book VIII: Faustwitz & the End of Earth
  - Book IX: Faustwitz & Planet Omega
  - Book X: Faustwitz-Hamilton
  - Book XI: Faustwitz Destroyer
  - Book XII: Faustwitz God
