= Blair (publisher) =

Small press based in North Carolina

- Predecessor: Carolina Wren Press (Note: The company had been known as Carolina Wren Press since its founding in the 1970s until it acquired the publisher John F. Blair in 2017 and thereafter rebranded itself as Blair effective January 1, 2018. However, while it does business as Blair, the underlying corporate entity remains registered under the legal name The Carolina Wren Press, Inc.)
- Founded: 1976; 50 years ago
- Founder: Judy Hogan
- Country of origin: United States
- Headquarters location: Durham, North Carolina
- Distribution: Consortium Book Sales and Distribution
- Publication types: Books
- Official website: blairpub.com

Blair (incorporated as The Carolina Wren Press, Inc.) is a literary small press publisher based in Durham, North Carolina, founded in 1976 as Carolina Wren Press by Judy Hogan. The press mainly publishes poetry (both full collections, and limited-edition chapbooks), but also publishes fiction and nonfiction, biography, autobiography, literary nonfiction by and/or about people of color, women, gay/lesbian issues, health and mental health topics in children's literature.

In 2017, Carolina Wren Press acquired the name and titles of John F. Blair, a regional publisher founded in 1954 and based in Winston-Salem. Blair's published works included the works of Charles H. Whedbee. After acquiring Blair, the press changed its name to Blair Publishing.

Each year, Blair honors one writer with the Doris Bakwin Award. As a literary small-press publisher, many members of the Board of Directors, as well as many previous judges for various contests, are volunteers from across the country.

== Foundation ==
From Judy Hogan's personal essay:

The roots of Carolina Wren were in Berkeley, California, though it was birthed on January 1, 1976, in Chapel Hill, as I sat in my living room in Chase Park Apartments, looking past the balcony, where I fed wintering birds, into the woods behind them. Chase Park had grown out of the Chapel Hill Civil Rights struggle and was run by the Interfaith Council...

Meanwhile, Thorp Springs Press had been publishing the writers I was finding and being found by: Virginia Long Rudder (After the Ifaluk), Miranda Cambanis (The Execution, a play), and Tom Huey (This Life: A Salutation, a poem broadside for Amon). Hyperion 12 (1975) had in it Lance Jeffers, T. J. Reddy, Jaki and Sherman Shelton, Amon, Miranda, Mitchell Lyman, Roz Wolbarsht, Marion Phillips, and Mike Riggsby. By the end of 1975, I had promised to publish Liner’s Chrome Grass, Bill Herron’s American Peasant, and Mike Riggsby’s Milky Way Poems. That December, when Paul and Foster visited me, he suggested I start my own press, arguing that the audience for my authors was more in North Carolina. So, on January 1, 1976, I decided to begin Carolina Wren Press. I chose the name because I loved the bird, its liking to be near people, its cheerful, confident call (“cheering, cheering, cheering you!”; certainly not “teakettle, teakettle, teakettle!”), and the male wren, I had leaned, constructed four or five nests, and then let the female choose the one she liked best.

I also was very aware by then that there was an “in crowd” of literati in North Carolina, and a triumvirate of respected literary men: Guy Owen, who edited Southern Poetry Review; Thad Stem of Oxford; and Sam Ragan, who edited The Pilot in Southern Pines. Charlene Whisnant had previously challenged their hegemony, and I had found myself surrounded by the writers who couldn’t break into the inner circle these three dominated. These men were good people, but their vision was limited as to what poetry could be and could express and who the important poets were. They seemed out of touch with all the new voices rising around me. So having ‘Carolina’ in the name of the press appealed to me. My writers were also important to North Carolina, and the South, even if the Carolina Quarterly (University of North Carolina at Chapel Hill's mag) and Southern Poetry Review wouldn’t publish them. They were a motley crew: African-Americans; new women writers; Amon Liner, who was extremely innovative; and some who were on the fringe — as was I — just because we were not from the South. All of us were intensely committed writers, with vision, with a lot to say to our audience. But we weren’t writing in the standard academic mold of a lyric poem organized around one central image.

A symptom of the way I felt was in my dedication of Hyperion 16, the special Southern issue and our last, which finally was published in 1980. I dedicated it to Amon Liner (1940-1976) and to T.J. Reddy (1945- ): “two outstanding Southern gentlemen.” There I was trying to break down stereotypes again!

In 1976 I was living on food stamps and in subsidized housing, plus receiving free daycare for Ginia under Title X as I made my way back into the job market. The COSMEP conference was in Austin, Texas, that year; and Paul organized it with other Austin area writers and editors. This time I went alone (Terry took the children to the West Coast to see his parents). It was a lively, warm, funny conference; I remember that we all broke up laughing when I described our new van project and told the assembled editors and writers that we’d all get to know each other better if we ate and slept together. There was also a woman there urging us to learn accounting so we could turn our liabilities into assets. I can’t say that I ever learned exactly how this worked, though I did learn how to keep books. But Paul revealed his own economic approach to book publishing when he claimed it only cost $.60 a book, and his wife, Foster, immediately contradicted him. His reply was that he had to believe it cost $.60 a book in order to keep publishing. I also remember vividly Len Randolph holding up a copy of the cover of Chrome Grass, talking about this new press, Carolina Wren, and how strange that felt, and how good. It was real. I was a publisher!

=== John F. Blair ===
John F. Blair was a small publisher based in Winston-Salem that primarily published regional works of fiction and poetry, centering on North Carolina. It was founded in 1954. published The Minotaur Takes a Cigarette Break, by Steven Sherrill, in 2000. By 2004, the Winston-Salem Journal described the novel as the publisher's most successful work, while their best selling publication of all time was Charles H. Whedbee's Legends of the Outer Banks. At that point, the press was publishing roughly 12 to 20 books a year. This figure had declined to around 6 to 8 by 2017.

=== Later history ===
In 2017, Carolina Wren acquired the trademarks and back catalog of John F. Blair. The publisher began doing business as Blair effective January 1, 2018.

== Contests and awards ==
In odd-numbered years, with a postmark deadline of February 15, the publisher reads full-length poetry collections by emerging authors who haven't had more than one full-length book published.

In even-numbered years, with a postmark deadline of February 15, the publisher reads submissions to the Doris Bakwin Award for Writing by a Woman.
