= Nine-Mile Bridge =

Bridge in Texas, US

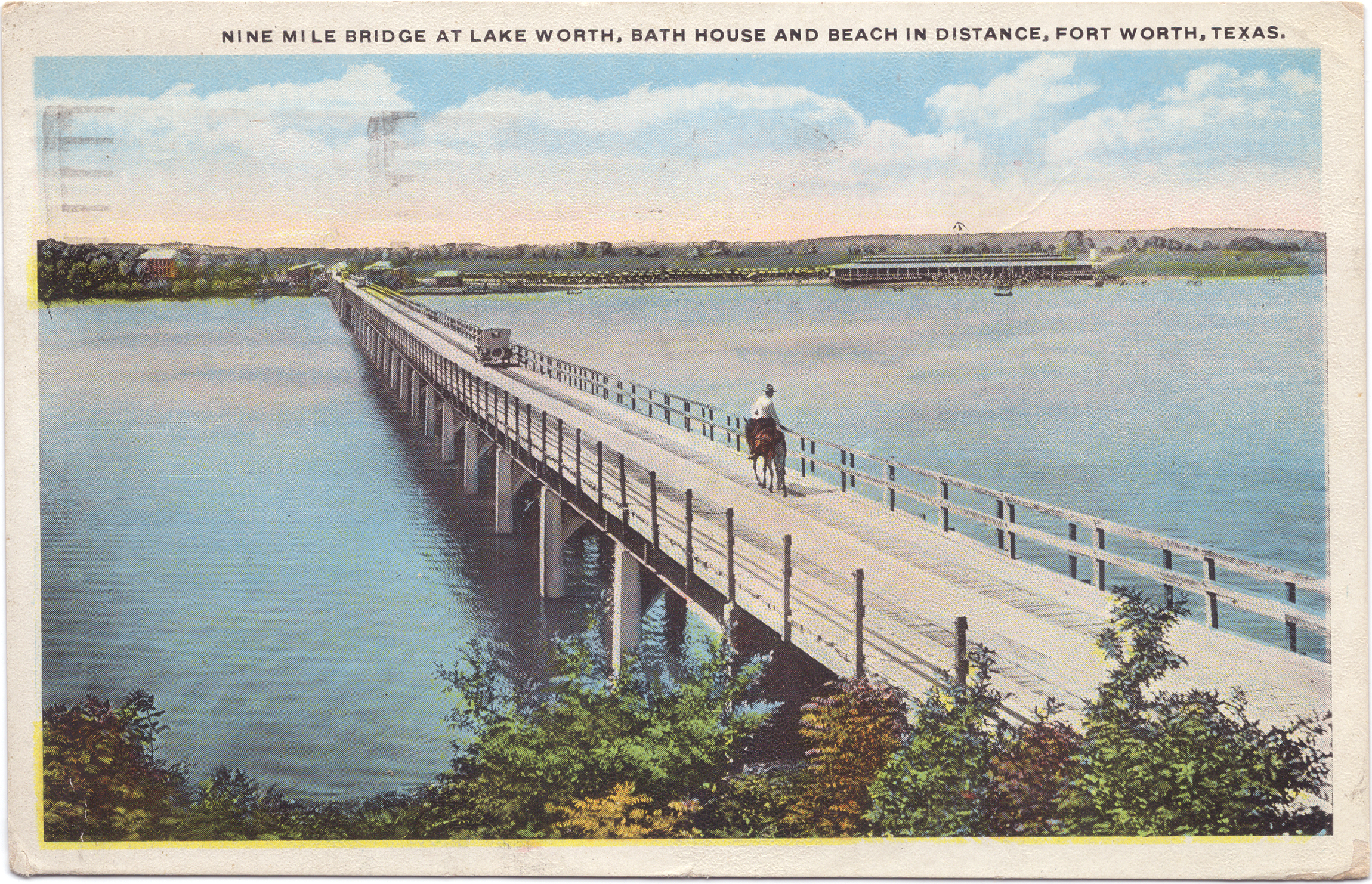
- 1921 postcard of Nine-Mile Bridge with Casino Beach visible in the background
- Coordinates: 32.820878°N 97.446284°W
- Carried: 2 lanes of Texas State Highway 199
- Crossed: Lake Worth (formerly Trinity River)
- Locale: Fort Worth, Texas
- Named for: Nine miles from Tarrant County Courthouse
- Maintained by: Texas Department of Transportation

Characteristics
- Material: Concrete (formerly wood)
- Width: 50 feet (15 m)

History
- Opened: 1914
- Rebuilt: 1928–1930
- Destroyed: 1953

The Nine-Mile Bridge is a bridge crossing Lake Worth in Fort Worth, Texas.

== History ==
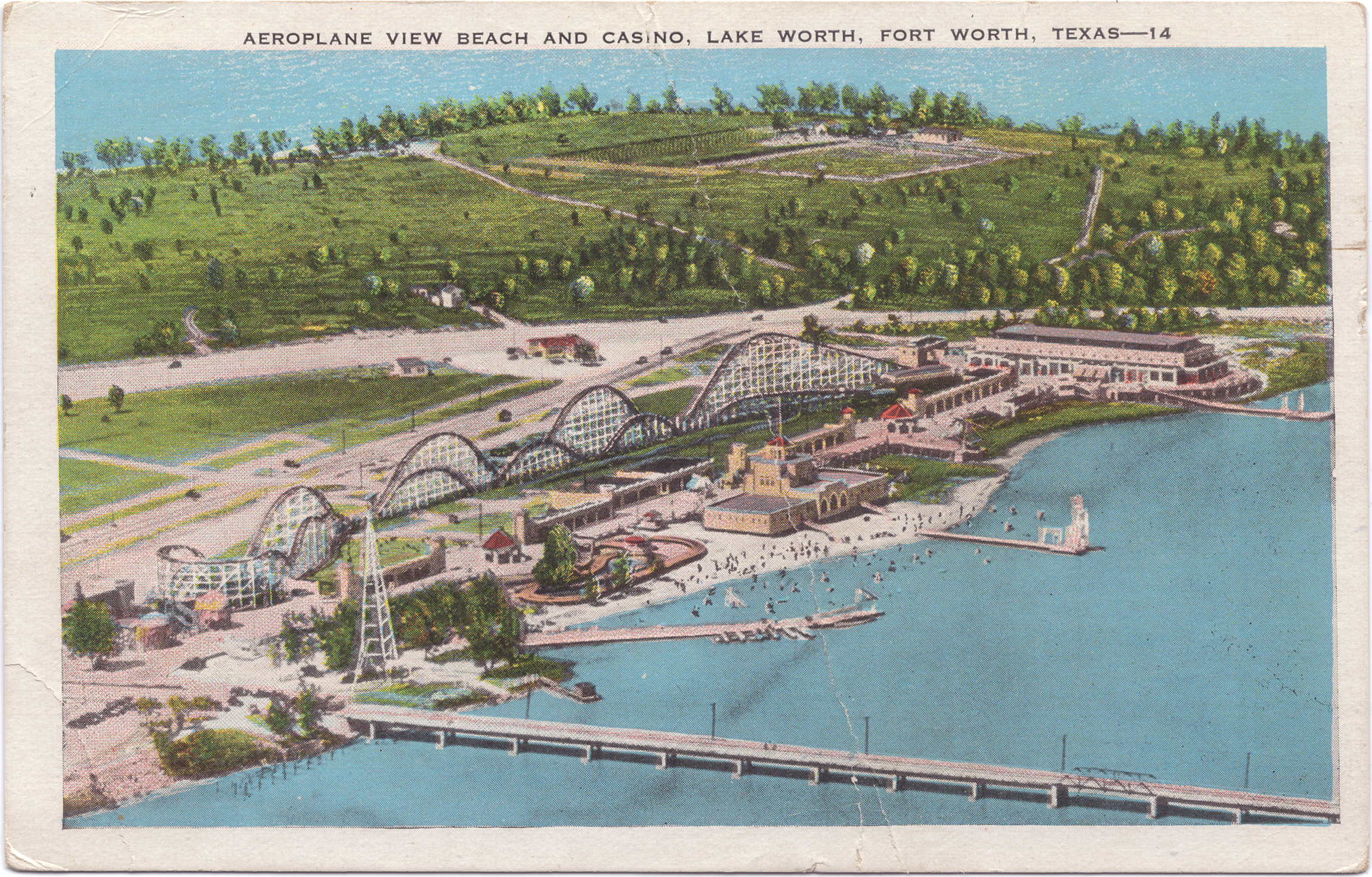
1932 postcard of Casino Beach with the Nine-Mile Bridge visible in the foreground

Nine-Mile Bridge bridge is not nine miles in length, but is instead named for being nine miles from Tarrant County Courthouse. Built 1912, the first bridge was thin and wooden, and often caused traffic congestion. Once crossing the Trinity River, it crossed the newly-created Lake Worth following the completion of the Lake Worth Dam in 1914.

In 1928, another Nine-Mile Bridge began construction, this one being around 1,000 feet (0.30 km) northwest of the previous and connecting to Texas State Highway 199. Costing $350,000, the bridge was 50 feet wide—36 feet for roadway and 14 feet for sidewalk. The bridge opened on May 7, 1930, close in time to the reopening of nearby Casino Beach. The old bridge was kept to mitigate congestion from Casino Beach, until 1953, when the 49th Armored Division used an artillery tractor to clear the bridge for speedboat races, besides for a stretch in the middle which became a platform for judges.
