= Goatman =

Goatman or Goat man may refer to:

- Goatman (urban legend), a legendary creature from Prince George's County, Maryland, United States
- Goatman (Kentucky), also known as the Pope Lick Monster, a legendary creature of Louisville, Kentucky, United States
- Goatman (Texas), also known as the Lake Worth monster, a legendary creature from Lake Worth, Texas, United States
- GoatMan: How I Took a Holiday from Being Human, a 2016 book by Thomas Thwaites
- The Goat Man, Ches McCartney (died 1998), American traveler
- Goatman or faun, mythical creature from Roman mythology
- Goatman or Faunus, Roman god and leader of the fauns
- Goat Man, a character from Masters of the Universe
- "Goatman", a 2012 song by Goat from the album World Music

== People with the name ==
- Susan Goatman (born 1945), English cricketer
