= Ricky Lee Green =

Executed American serial killer (1960–1997)

- Born: December 27, 1960; Fort Worth, Texas, U.S.
- Died: October 8, 1997 (aged 36); Huntsville Unit, Texas, U.S.
- Status: Executed by lethal injection
- Convictions: Capital murder Murder (x2)
- Penalty: Death

Details
- Victims: 4–12
- Span of crimes: 1985–1986
- Country: United States
- State: Texas
- Date apprehended: April 27, 1989

Ricky Lee Green (December 27, 1960 – October 8, 1997) was an American serial killer who murdered at least four people in Texas between 1985 and 1986, at least two of which were killed with the help of his wife, Sharon. Convicted of all four murders and sentenced to death in one case, Green was executed at the Huntsville Unit in 1997.

== Early life ==
Ricky Lee Green was born on December 27, 1960, in Fort Worth, Texas. He had several siblings. Together with his siblings, he was physically abused by his father, Bill Green, on an almost daily basis. The elder Green would apply shocks to their bodies, punch them in the stomachs or hold them underwater until they nearly drowned when they went on fishing trips. At some point during his childhood, Green lost use in one eye after suffering an accident involving barbed wire, which later had to be replaced with a glass eye. He attended school up until the 8th grade, when he dropped out and started working as a radiator repairman. He later met and subsequently married Sharon Dollar, a fellow drug abuser who would later aid in killing his victims.

== Murders ==
On April 24, 1985, 16-year-old Jeffery Lynn Davis disappeared from Casino Beach, Fort Worth. His nearly decapitated, mutilated and castrated body was found the next April in a swamp near the Fort Worth Nature Center and Refuge.

On October 12, 1985, Green picked up 28-year-old Betty Jo Monroe, a topless dancer living in Amarillo, and then drove to the Greens' mobile home in Boyd. There, she was sexually assaulted, stabbed 17 times, struck with a hammer and one of her breasts was mutilated. Green left the woman's body in a rural area in Flatwood. The body was found the next day, but coroners were unable to establish the victim's identity at the time.

A month later, on November 23, Green met 27-year-old Sandra Lorraine Bailey at a club in Fort Worth, where she had gone to celebrate her cousin's birthday. Bailey was sexually assaulted at Green's Fort Worth home, stabbed 30 times and bludgeoned with a hammer. Her nude body was left in drainage culvert near Henrietta the next day, where it was later found on December 2.

Green's final known killing occurred on December 29, 1986, when he picked up an acquaintance, 28-year-old KXAS-TV sales executive Steven Michael Fefferman, at the beach, as the former wanted to celebrate his birthday by having casual sex. Fefferman's body was found at his home, bound to his bed and stabbed to death. Green then covered the body with linen, stole all the money from the house and fled in Fefferman's car.

== Trial, imprisonment and execution ==
Over the next two years, Sharon divorced her husband and went to a drug addiction counsellor in Stephenville, to whom she eventually confessed that her ex-husband had killed multiple people. On the counsellor's advice, she was encouraged to inform local police about the crimes, based on which, together with tips from Crime Stoppers and the fact that Green was a suspect in a previous murder case, Ricky was arrested on April 27, 1989. While held in the Tarrant County jail on $1.25 million bond, Green confessed to the four murders and was questioned in eight similar killings that had occurred in the Fort Worth area.

During the investigation, authorities were told by Sharon and Bill Green about a mysterious mattress, allegedly covered in a potential fifth victim's blood, which Ricky had given to his father for storage. According to them, Green had invited an unknown man to his mobile home in 1984 or 1985, stabbed him during sex and then dropped him off at a hospital in Fort Worth. While this lead was investigated, whether it was verified or not remains unclear.

Over the next two months, Green gave detailed confessions to the four murders, claiming that he never forced his ex-wife to help and that she was a willing participant. Sharon claimed that she was forced to participate and keep silent about the murders in fear that he would kill her as well. In June 1989, Green went on a hunger strike over the squalid prison conditions.

In February 1990, Sharon Green was found guilty in the Monroe and Bailey murders, but, as part of a plea bargain, she was sentenced to 10 years probation.

Green was found guilty of capital murder by the jury, with his only reaction upon being read the verdict that he wasn't surprised at the outcome.

Due to the heavy media coverage of the trial, the venue was moved to Austin. During the penalty phase, in spite of Green's attorneys' demands, prosecutors informed the jury about the other pending charges against the defendant.

Green's defense introduced testimony about Bill Green's abuse of his children as a main drive for his son's murders. Family members were divided and the presiding judge warned them that they would be imprisoned for contempt if there were disruptions.

On September 22, 1990, after the jury deliberated for less than an hour on the case, Ricky Lee Green was sentenced to death for the murder of Fefferman. He was later given a life sentence for the Bailey murder, and as part of a guilty plea, he was given a second life term in the Davis case, while the charges in the Monroe slaying were dropped. His death sentence was automatically appealed to a federal court in Fort Worth, which granted him a stay of execution in 1994, until all of his appeals were properly reviewed by the state.

Eventually, all of his appeals for commutation were rejected, and on October 8, 1997, Ricky Lee Green was executed by lethal injection at the Huntsville Unit. His last meal consisted of five scrambled eggs, four sausage patties, eight slices of toast, six slices of bacon, and four pints of milk. In a break of procedure, prison officials had to use only a single needle instead of the customary two, as they had trouble finding a suitable vein to inject due to Green's long-time drug addiction. In his final statement, he expressed gratitude to God, his friends and fellow death row inmates, apologized to his victims' relatives and said that his death wasn't going to solve anything.

== See also ==
- Capital punishment in Texas
- Capital punishment in the United States
- List of people executed by lethal injection
- List of people executed in Texas, 1990–1999
- List of people executed in the United States in 1997
- List of serial killers by number of victims
- List of serial killers in the United States

== Bibliography ==
- Patricia Springer (May 1, 1994). Blood Rush. Pinnacle. ISBN 0786005521.
- Laurence Tancredi (September 19, 2005). Hardwired Behavior: What Neuroscience Reveals about Morality. Cambridge University Press. ASIN B000SET8Q0.
- Bill Crawford (January 28, 2008). Texas Death Row: Executions in the Modern Era. Plume. ISBN 978-0452289307.
