= Fort Worth Nature Center and Refuge =

Nature center in Texas

Fort Worth Nature Center & Refuge
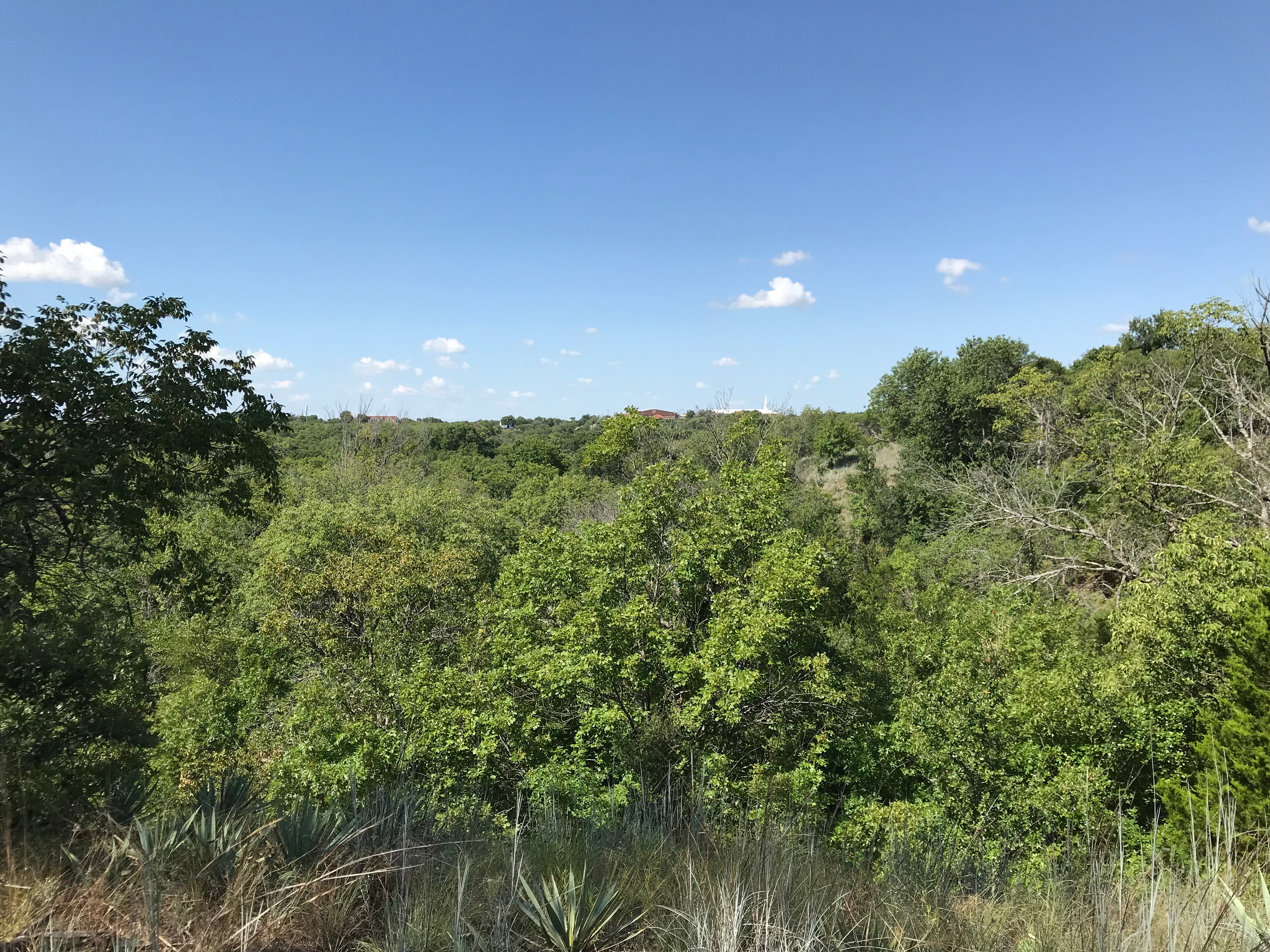
- Scenic view spot on a trail at the Fort Worth Nature Center & Refuge

- Location within Texas
- Location: Fort Worth, Tarrant County, Texas, United States
- Nearest city: Lakeside, Texas
- Coordinates: 32.827317°N 97.478913°W
- Area: 3,621 acres (1,465 ha)
- Established: 1964
- Governing body: City of Fort Worth
- Website: www.fwnaturecenter.org

The Fort Worth Nature Center & Refuge is a nature center located between Lakeside and Lake Worth, Texas within Fort Worth, Texas, United States city limits. It consists of prairies, forests, and wetlands. The nature center offers a glimpse of what the Dallas–Fort Worth metroplex looked like before settlement. The center covers 3,621 acres (1,465 ha) and includes over 20 miles (32 km) of hiking trails. It is one of the largest city-owned nature centers in the United States.

== History ==
The center was created to protect the local watershed of Fort Worth. Lake Worth was built in 1914, and land around the West Fork of the Trinity River to protect the drinking water quality for the community.

The Civilian Conservation Corps Camp No. 1816 was the first to be tasked with developing the land into a state park. While the nature center never ended up as a state park, the CCC's contributions can still be seen to this day. The group built the rock steps of the Caprock and Canyon Ridge trails. The remnants of rock shelters they built are still standing, nicknamed Lone Point, Rest Awhile, and Broadview. Hikers can also see concrete and stone picnic tables and restroom facilities on the Canyon Ridge trail and elsewhere.

In 1964, with the help of citizens and the Fort Worth Audubon Society, the city's Park Board designated land for a wildlife sanctuary and nature preserve for the community, and thus the Fort Worth Nature Center was born. The Audubon Society started laying out trails and set up a shelter house on Greer Island, a small island in the nature center. In 1967, the City of Fort Worth purchased land with expiring leases and expanded the center to over 3,000 acres (1,200 ha). In 1970, the city began planning for an official building in the center. The Bureau of Outdoor Recreation matched a grant of $40,000 from the city, and the Hardwicke Interpretive Center was built the next year after local conservationist Robert E. Hardwicke. In 1975, the name Fort Worth Nature Center and Refuge was formally established.

The Friends of the Fort Worth Nature Center & Refuge (FONC) was established June 1, 1974 as a nonprofit organization with goals to preserve and protect the natural and cultural resources. They function as the chief financial supporter of the center.

== Hardwicke Interpretive Center ==
The Hardwicke Interpretive Center is a building located within the nature center that serves as the educational stronghold of the center. Here, guests can peruse displays and info that teach about local weather, plants, animals and fossils. A gift shop provides field guides, books, and stuffed animals to enjoy. Animal exhibits are located inside and outside and feature non-releasable ambassador animals that help educate the public about local wildlife native to the nature center. The outside area features a butterfly garden that can be seen from the inside for convenient birdwatching opportunities.

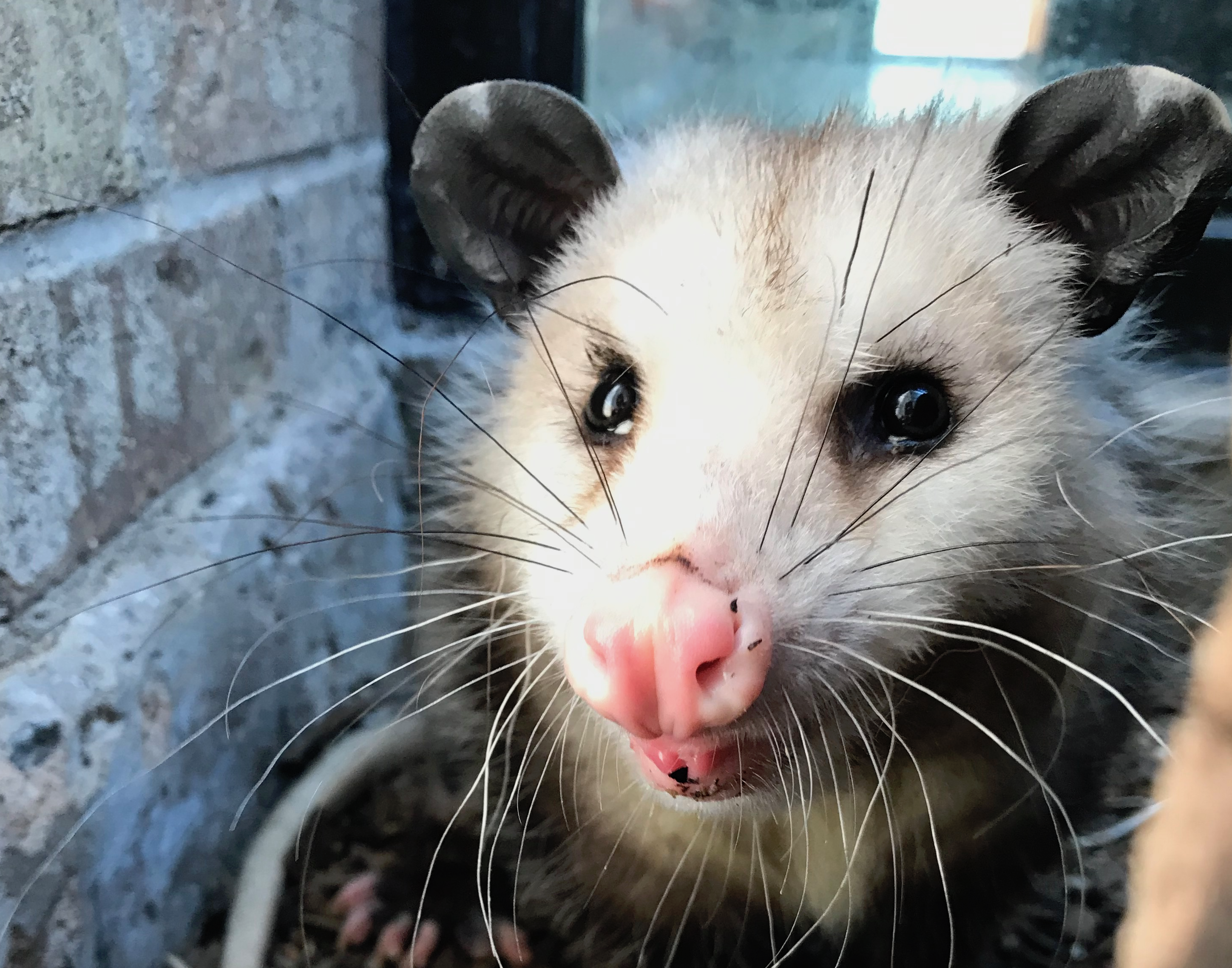
Virginia opossum ambassador & education animal at the FWNCR

Naturalists at the nature center provide various educational experiences to enhance the learning process. Field experience helps supplement classroom learning, and groups that get field experience include public schools, private schools, home school groups, scouting groups, civic groups and more. Naturalists will also go on outreach programs to schools or groups, bringing animal ambassadors and other educational props to enhance the experience. Most often, they travel to various schools and community centers to speak to children. Lastly, the interpretive center hosts holiday and summer programs for families. They have canoeing, specialty hikes, bison-feeding hayrides, and summer camps.

== Trails ==
=== Paddling Trail ===
The Fort Worth Nature Center & Refuge Paddlings Trail is a water trail that is a 6-7 mile long loop that can take around 2-3 hours to float through. This section of the West Fork of the Trinity River is located between Eagle Mountain Lake dam and Lake Worth (Texas). There are two canoe launch areas, the Big River Canoe Launch located at (-97.47429,32.84835) and the sometimes-inaccessible Greer Island Paddle Launch located at (-97.45988,32.82494). The trail follows the West Fork of the Trinity River downstream to and into Greer Island Bay, one of the most scenic and natural sections of the Trinity River in the Dallas/Fort Worth Metroplex. Civilian Conservation Corps structures may be seen along the trail. Paddlers can extend their trip upstream all the way to the Eagle Mountain Lake dam and downstream into Lake Worth. The nature center offers guided canoe/kayak trips with a Certified Interpretive Guide.

=== Canyon Ridge Trail ===
This is a 3.25 mile long, point-to-point trail that follows limestone and sandstone outcroppings that also dip into canyons. This trail is the most difficult for hikers due to the changes in terrain. The trail shows off the unique geology of the area, from loose sand to limestone. Rock structures built by the CCC can be observed at the two highest points in the trail. A steep set of stairs on the trail also was built by the CCC.

== Bison herd ==
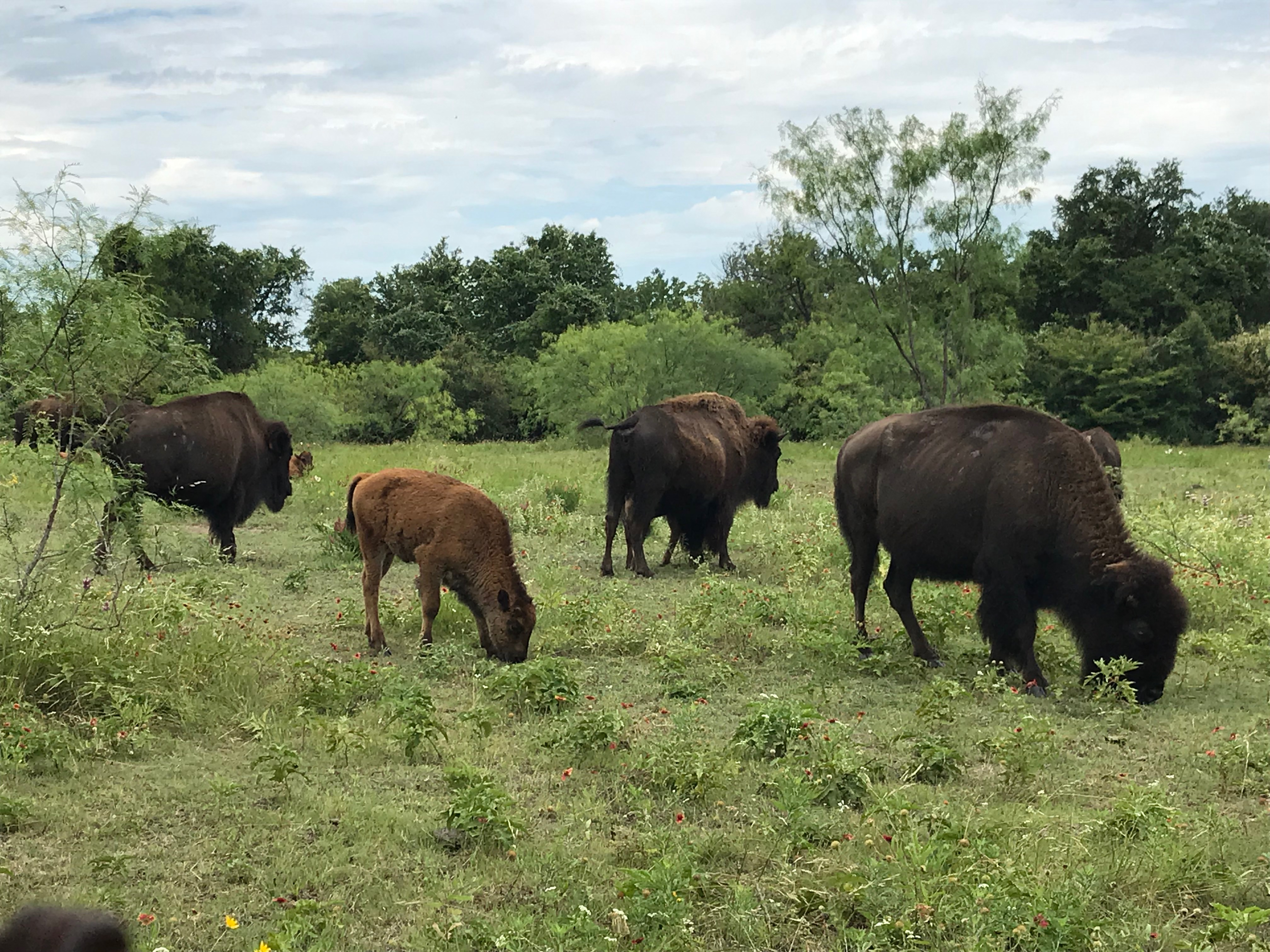
The bison herd at the Fort Worth Nature Center & Refuge

The refuge is home to a herd of American bison. The herd started with a donation of three bison from the Wichita Mountains Wildlife Refuge in 1973. The first calf, a heifer, was born in 1974. Most of the calves are born in April and May. The bison range consists of five pastures totaling 210 acres (85 ha). The permanent herd has one bull, thirteen cows, and various calves and yearlings from previous years.

The herd serves three main purposes - education, species conservation and ecological value. The herd serves as a visual aid for people to learn about animal adaptations, land management programs, and prairie ecology. Bison are a Keystone species for Texas blackland prairies and the herd is used to assist with natural land management that mimics how free-roaming bison affected the land before they were extirpated.

Most current bison herds are genetically polluted or partly crossbred with cattle, either purposefully or accidentally. The refuge partners with university researchers to conduct studies using the bison herd. Whenever a new animal is added to the herd through purchase, donation, or birth, the nature center has the animal tested. Testing is conducted by Texas A&M University and the results are added to a national bison genetics registry.

== Wildlife and ecology ==
Fish

- sunfish
- largemouth bass
- white bass
- crappie
- catfish

Birds

- great blue herons
- great egrets
- snowy egrets
- belted kingfishers
- ospreys
- wood ducks
- hawks
- owls

Trees

- cottonwood
- elm
- sycamore
- pecan
- ash
- black willow
- other oak species

Wetland plants

- cattails
- bulrushes
- water willow
- broadleaf arrowhead
- pond weed

Other wildlife

- deer
- beavers
- prairie dogs
- turtles
- snakes
- raccoons
- alligators

== See also ==
- Tandy Hills Natural Area
- Lake Worth Monster
