= Casino Beach (Fort Worth, Texas) =

Beach and park in Texas, US

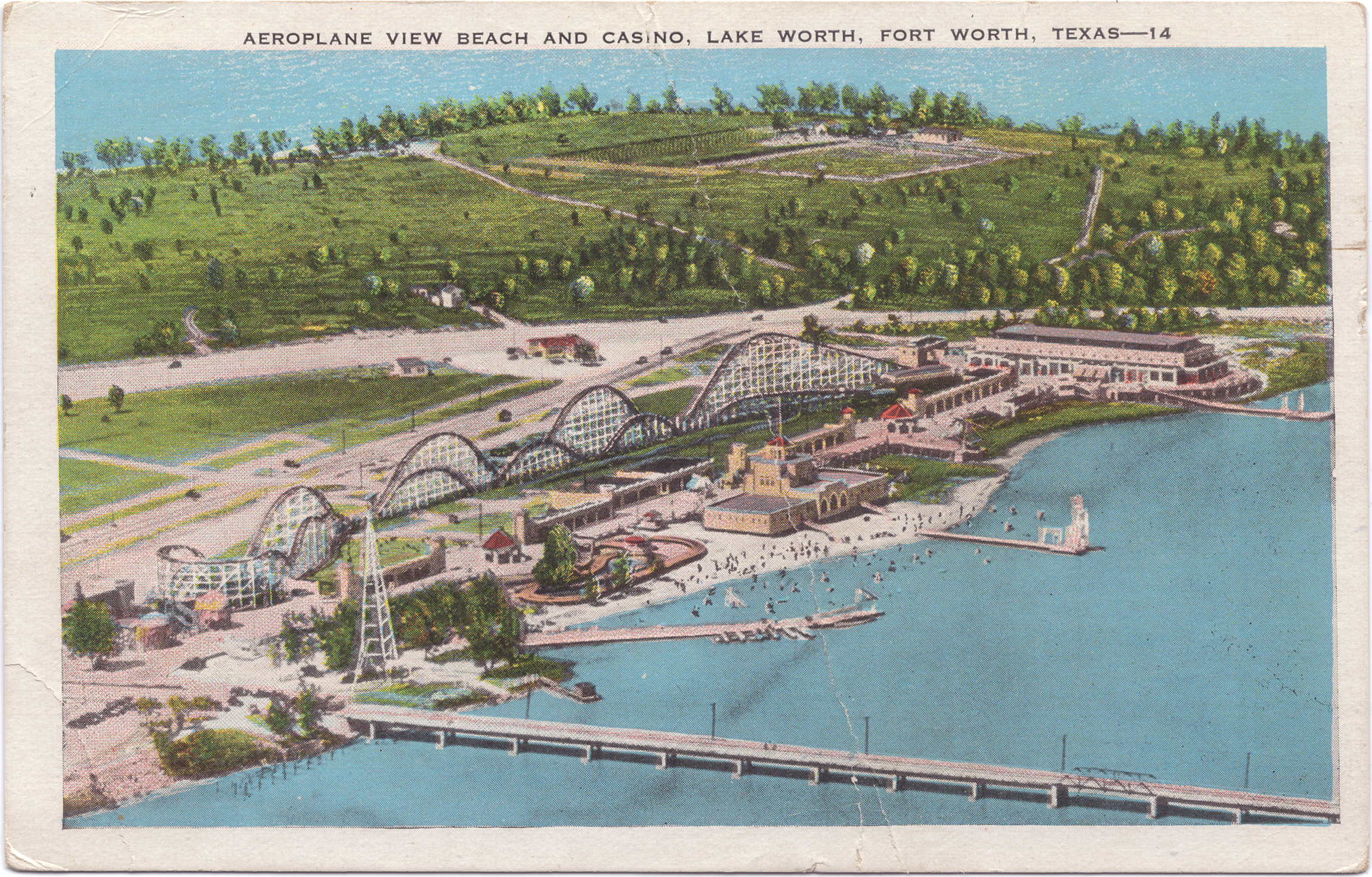
- 1932 postcard of Casino Beach

- Location within Texas
- Interactive map of Casino Beach
- Nearest city: Fort Worth, Texas
- Coordinates: 32.820751°N 97.453379°W
- Area: 44 acres (0.18 km^{2})
- Opened: 1917
- Closed: 1989

Casino Beach is a 44-acre public beach and recreational center on Lake Worth in Fort Worth, Texas.

== History ==
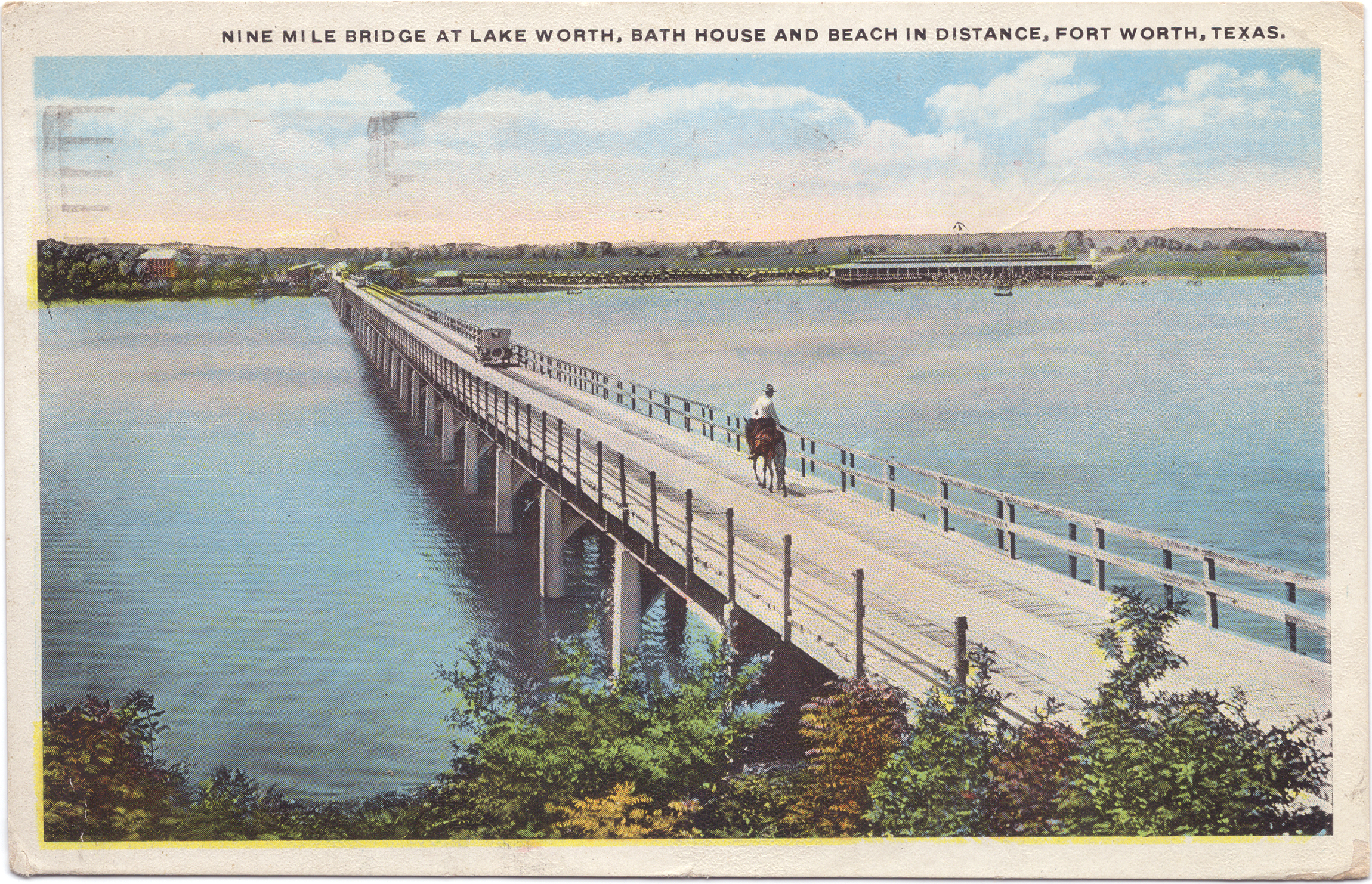
1921 postcard of Nine-Mile Bridge with Casino Beach visible in the background

Situated on Lake Worth and the Nine-Mile Bridge, the Fort Worth government built amenities there in 1917. A popular destination in the city, carnival companies were contracted in 1919 to build attractions, and the Fort Worth Auto Bus Company was established to transport visitors to the beach. In summer 1920, it received 6,000 visitors per day, with 150,000 natatorium tickets being sold in the same period. Also in 1920, a gathering spot—called a "casino", despite not containing gambling equipment—and a dance hall were built, but burnt down in 1921.

In December 1926, the Lake Worth Amusement Company was established by Ohio businessmen E. R. Albaugh and French L. Wilgus. They purchased the beach and amenities and leased it back to the Fort Worth government, using the lease money to fund a resort and renovations totaling $1,000,000. Reopening May 28, 1927, Casino Beach was given a boardwalk, renovations to its dance hall and a small , as well as the then largest rollercoaster in the Southwestern United States, the Thriller; it costed $100,000 and was advertized as the "Atlantic City of the West". In 1928, a visitor fell out of the rollercoaster—built without safety harnesses—and was injured; the following year six other visitors were injured in a traffic collision between a car and the park's train ride. They were found guilty in the respective lawsuits.

On June 17, 1929, a fire destroyed the natatorium, most of the amusement park and some of the boardwalk, as well as killing a gorilla in the zoo named Big Boy. After $250,000 in reconstruction, it reopened on May 7, 1930, the same day as the nearby Texas State Highway 199 bridge, which replaced the Nine-Mile Bridge.

Casino Park prospered midst the Great Depression; its dance hall hosted jazzists such as Louis Armstrong, Count Basie, Tommy Dorsey, Duke Ellington, Stan Kenton, Dorothy Lamour, Guy Lombardo, Ray McKinley, Harry James and Rudy Vallée, and annual Independence Day fireworks celebrations were hosted. Despite such, the Lake Worth Amusement Company closed in 1936, and was re-established as New Casino, Inc. In 1937, the Civilian Conservation Corps built a shelter there, which was later converted as a lake patrol station.

On July 4, 1940, the boardwalk was demolished after part of it collapsed under the weight of fireworks spectators; 56 were injured. New Casino closed from financial difficultues in August 1940, and Casino Beach remained open from a 5-year lease proposed by George T. Smith, the park's manager from 1929. The natatorium was destroyed in a 1943 fire and not rebuilt. New Casino was sued by the Fort Worth government in 1946, for continuing to operate after the lease expired. Settled in 1947, the Supreme Court of Texas awarded Fort Worth $15,000, as well as the land and buildings, which were leased back to Smith until 1948, when he sold the company to businessman Joe E. Landwehr.

In late 1950 or early 1951, businessman Jerry Starnes founded Lake Worth Beach, Inc., and received leases to rebuild and renovate. Casino Beach reopened in summer 1951. Due to a 1956 a swimmer sued the park after he became paralyzed there. In November 1970, Casino Beach was officially named as a public park. In 1985, Ricky Lee Green kidnapped teenager Jeffery Lynn Davis from Casino Beach and murdered him. Droughts, unpaid loans from Fort Worth and competition from Eagle Mountain and Benbrook Lake, Starnes retired and returned the land to Fort Worth in 1989. Its buildings were demolished in 1990 due to city expansion.

In 2011, the Patterson Equity Partners company of Arlington, Texas agreed to take lease for 17 acres of Casino Beach. They received a $29,000,000 loan from Pinnacle Financial Partners to rebuild. It never reopened.

It is a launch site for the canoes of the Trinity River Paddling Trail, a trail that was officially named a National Recreation Trail by the National Park Service in November 2020.
