= Pope Lick Monster =

Urban legend

Coordinates: 38.191953°N 85.487900°W

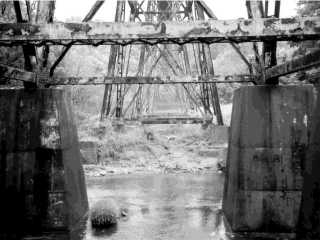
- The railroad trestle over Pope Lick Creek in Louisville, Kentucky, which is the home of the Pope Lick Monster, according to legend

Creature information
- Other name: Goatman
- Similar entities: Goatman, Lake Worth Monster
- Folklore: Cryptid

Origin
- First attested: 1988
- Country: United States
- Region: Kentucky

The Pope Lick Monster (more commonly, colloquially, the Goat Man) is a legendary part-man, part-goat and part-sheep creature reported to live beneath a railroad trestle bridge over Pope Lick Creek, in the Fisherville neighborhood of Louisville, Kentucky, United States.

Numerous urban legends exist about the creature's origins and the methods it employs to claim its victims. According to some accounts, the creature uses either hypnosis or voice mimicry to lure trespassers onto the trestle to meet their death before an oncoming train. Other stories claim the monster jumps down from the trestle onto the roofs of cars passing beneath it. Yet other legends tell that it attacks its victims with a blood-stained axe and that the very sight of the creature is so unsettling that those who see it while walking across the high trestle are driven to leap off.

Other legends hold that the monster is a human-goat hybrid, and that it was a circus freak who vowed revenge after being mistreated. In one version, it is said the monster escaped after a train derailed on the trestle. Another version commonly told by locals of the area claims that the monster is really the twisted reincarnated form of a farmer who sacrificed goats in exchange for Satanic powers.

The legends have turned the area into a site for legend tripping. There have been a number of deaths and accidents at the trestle since its construction, despite the presence of an 8-foot (2.4 m) fence to keep thrill-seekers out.

Norfolk Southern train crossing Pope Lick trestle bridge

There is a common misconception that the trestle is abandoned and no longer used; in reality, the bridge carries a major rail artery into Louisville. Heavy freight trains cross the bridge several times daily, so it is easy for someone to get caught atop it while an oncoming train barrels down on them. Norfolk Southern Railway urged citizens not to climb the trestle, saying if caught they would be arrested.

== Media ==
The monster was the subject of a 1988 film by Louisville filmmaker Ron Schildknecht called The Legend of the Pope Lick Monster. The 16-minute, $6,000 film premiered on December 29, 1988, at the Uptown Theater. Most of the film was shot at the Pope Lick Trestle, but scenes showing the characters up on the trestle were shot at another, safer location.

Norfolk Southern Railway officials were very upset about the film, as they thought it would encourage teenagers to visit the trestles. They found one scene in particular dangerously misleading. In the scene, the main character, a high school student, narrowly escapes an approaching train by hanging off the side of the trestle. In reality, few people would have the strength to hang on for the 5 to 7 minutes it takes for a long train to clear the 772-foot (235 m) trestle; in addition, the vibrations from the train are so strong that the ground beneath the trestle shakes as the train passes.

Because railroad officials were worried that the film would add to the death toll, Norfolk Southern issued a statement, read at the premiere, which warned of the trestle's dangers and informed the audience that anyone caught on the trestle could be prosecuted for trespassing.

The story of the monster was featured in an episode of Destination America's Monsters and Mysteries in America titled "Ozarks".

== Deaths ==
Several people have died on or near the train trestle at Pope Creek in pursuit of the Pope Lick Monster legend. In 1988, a 17-year-old young man, Jack “J.C.” Charles Bahm II, was hit and killed by a train, and another young man was injured while trying to cross the trestle. In 1994, a man was killed by a train after his ATV overturned on the trestle, trapping him on the track. In 2000, a 19-year-old man fell to his death after encountering a train. On April 23, 2016, a 26-year-old tourist, Roquel Bain, from Ohio died after being hit by a train while searching for the monster. Her boyfriend survived by hanging on the side of the trestle. On May 26, 2019, Savanna Bright, 15, was pronounced dead at the scene after she and another teenage girl, Kaylee Keeling, were on the train tracks near the Pope Lick trestle. Keeling survived and was taken to University of Louisville Hospital.

== See also ==
- History of Louisville, Kentucky
- Goatman
- Baphomet
- Satyr/Faun
