= Lake Worth Monster =

Legendary creature in Texan folklore

Creature information
- Other name(s): Texas Goatman, Mud-Man
- Similar entities: Goatman, Pope Lick Monster
- Folklore: Cryptid

Origin
- First attested: 1969
- Country: United States
- Region: Texas

In Texan folklore, the Lake Worth Monster is a legendary creature said to inhabit Lake Worth at the Fort Worth Nature Center and Refuge, just outside Fort Worth. The creature is often described as a "part-man, part-goat" with scales and long clawed fingers.

== History ==
Reports of sightings by local citizens of "a half-man, half-goat, with fur and scales" in July 1969 led to the belief that a mysterious creature lived in Lake Worth. Newspapers reported the alleged sightings, including one in which the monster landed on a man's car after jumping out of a tree, and another in which it threw an automobile tire at a group of people. Newspapers also published a photograph purportedly taken of the creature by Allen Plaster, and locals began driving out to the lake at night to get a look at it. Local police investigated the claims, but found no evidence of the monster in the Lake Worth and Greer Island area. According to one reporter, the Goatman legend was spread via summer camp stories, where camp counselors told children to “listen carefully...and you’ll hear his cry on clear nights like tonight”.

In a later interview, Allen Plaster commented on the photo, described as a man-sized "white furball", that he took while driving past the Nature Center in 1969. He said he believed that the sighting was a prank, stating “whatever it was, it wanted to be seen". Since reports of the monster ceased when school resumed, many suspected the incidents were pranks carried out by high school students. In 2005, a reporter at the Fort Worth Star-Telegram received an anonymous letter from someone claiming to be one of three high school classmates who, in the summer of 1969, "decided to go out to Lake Worth and scare people" using a tinfoil mask. In 2009, Fort Worth, Texas magazine published a report about an unidentified man who claimed that he had been a perpetrator of the tire-throwing incident.

Cryptozoologist-blogger Craig Woolheater said he believes the Lake Worth monster is an "undiscovered, uncataloged primate species that walks on two legs".

== Popular culture ==
Since 2009 (the 40th anniversary of the sightings), the Fort Worth Nature Center and Refuge has held a Lake Worth Monster Bash each October. In 2019, the Fort Worth Water Department's H2OMG Podcast released a four-part audio series on the legend of the Lake Worth Monster.

== See also ==
- Maryland Goatman
- Pope Lick Monster
