= Confederate Monument (Fort Worth, Texas) =

Confederate memorial in Fort Worth, Texas, US

Monument to Confederate war soldiers
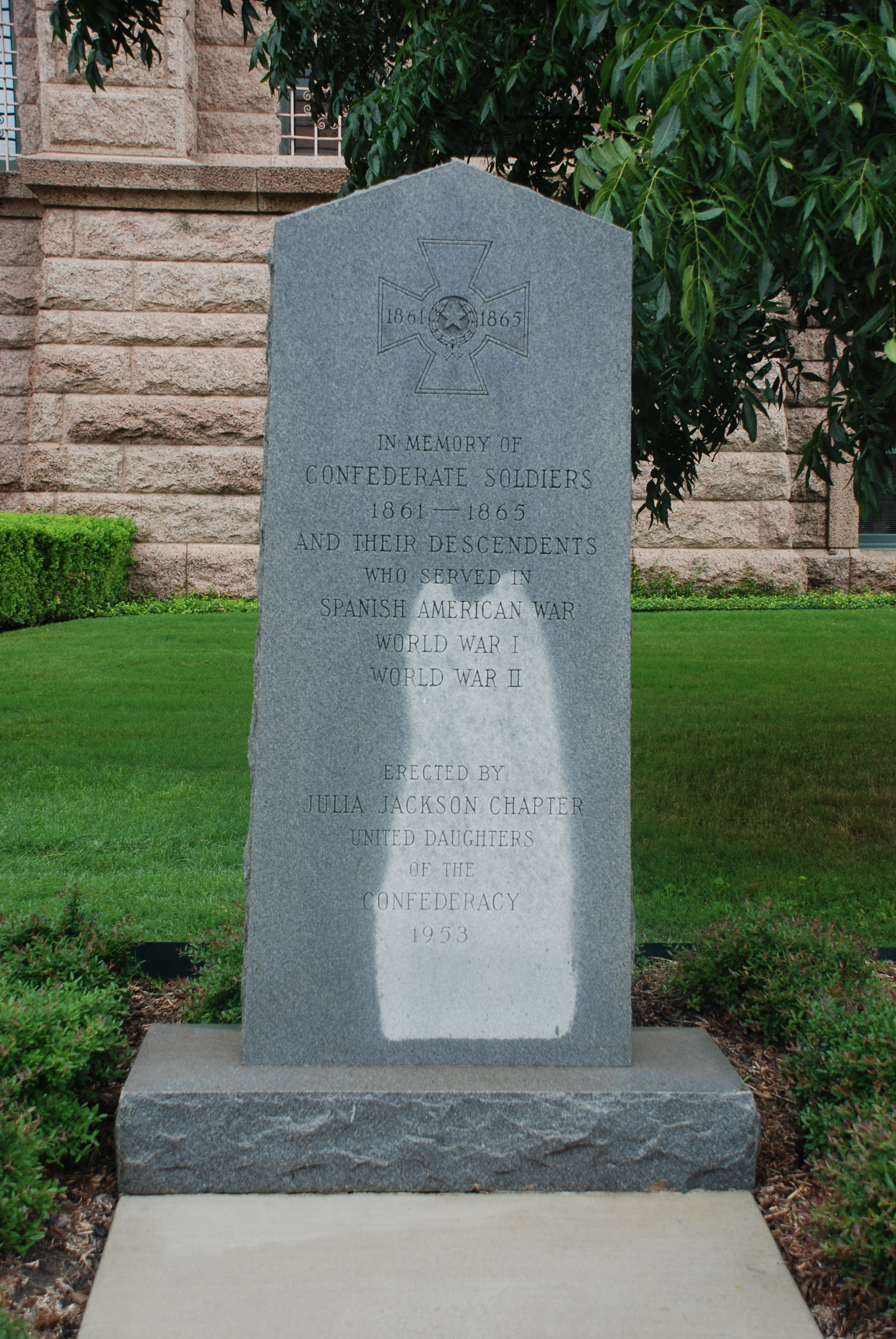
- Completion date: 1953
- Medium: Sculpture
- Location: Fort Worth, Texas

The Monument to Confederate war soldiers was an outdoor Confederate memorial located outside of the Tarrant County Courthouse in Fort Worth, Texas. The memorial was funded by the United Daughters of the Confederacy in 1953.

== Inscription ==
In Memory of[2] 
Confederate Soldiers
1861 - 1865
And their Descendents
Who Served in
Spanish American War
World War I
World War II
Erected By
Julia Jackson Chapter
United Daughters 
Of The
Confederacy

== Removal ==
During the George Floyd protests in June 2020, following the murder of George Floyd, a number of statues and memorials were toppled or removed. After residents defaced the monument the Tarrant County commission voted to remove it. The monument was removed on June 13, 2020, and moved to storage.

== See also ==
- List of Confederate monuments and memorials
- List of monuments and memorials removed during the George Floyd protests
- Removal of Confederate monuments and memorials
