= Tarrant County Courthouse =

- U.S. National Register of Historic Places
- Texas State Antiquities Landmark
- Recorded Texas Historic Landmark
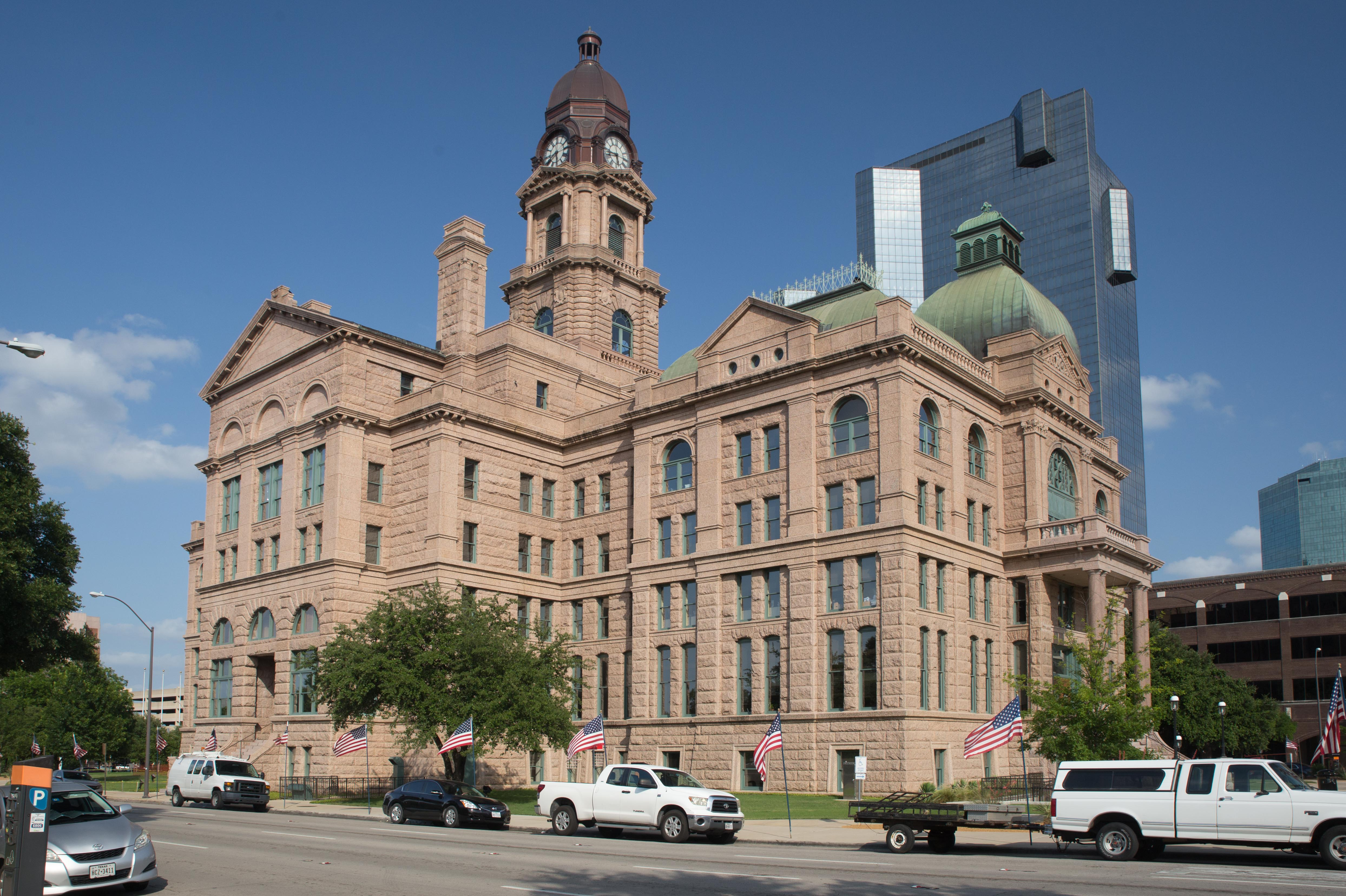
- North elevation of Tarrant County Courthouse in 2016

- Location within Texas Location within the United States
- Interactive map showing the location for Tarrant County Courthouse
- Location: Bounded by Houston, Belknap, Weatherford, and Commerce Sts., Fort Worth, Texas
- Coordinates: 32°45′26″N 97°19′58″W
- Area: 2.3 acres (0.93 ha)
- Built: 1893; 133 years ago
- Architect: Gunn & Curtis
- Architectural style: Late 19th and 20th Century Revivals, Renaissance
- NRHP reference No.: 70000762
- TSAL No.: 8200000576
- RTHL No.: 5195

Significant dates
- Added to NRHP: October 15, 1970
- Designated TSAL: January 1, 1981
- Designated RTHL: 1969

The Tarrant County Courthouse is part of the Tarrant County government campus in Fort Worth, Texas, United States.

== History ==
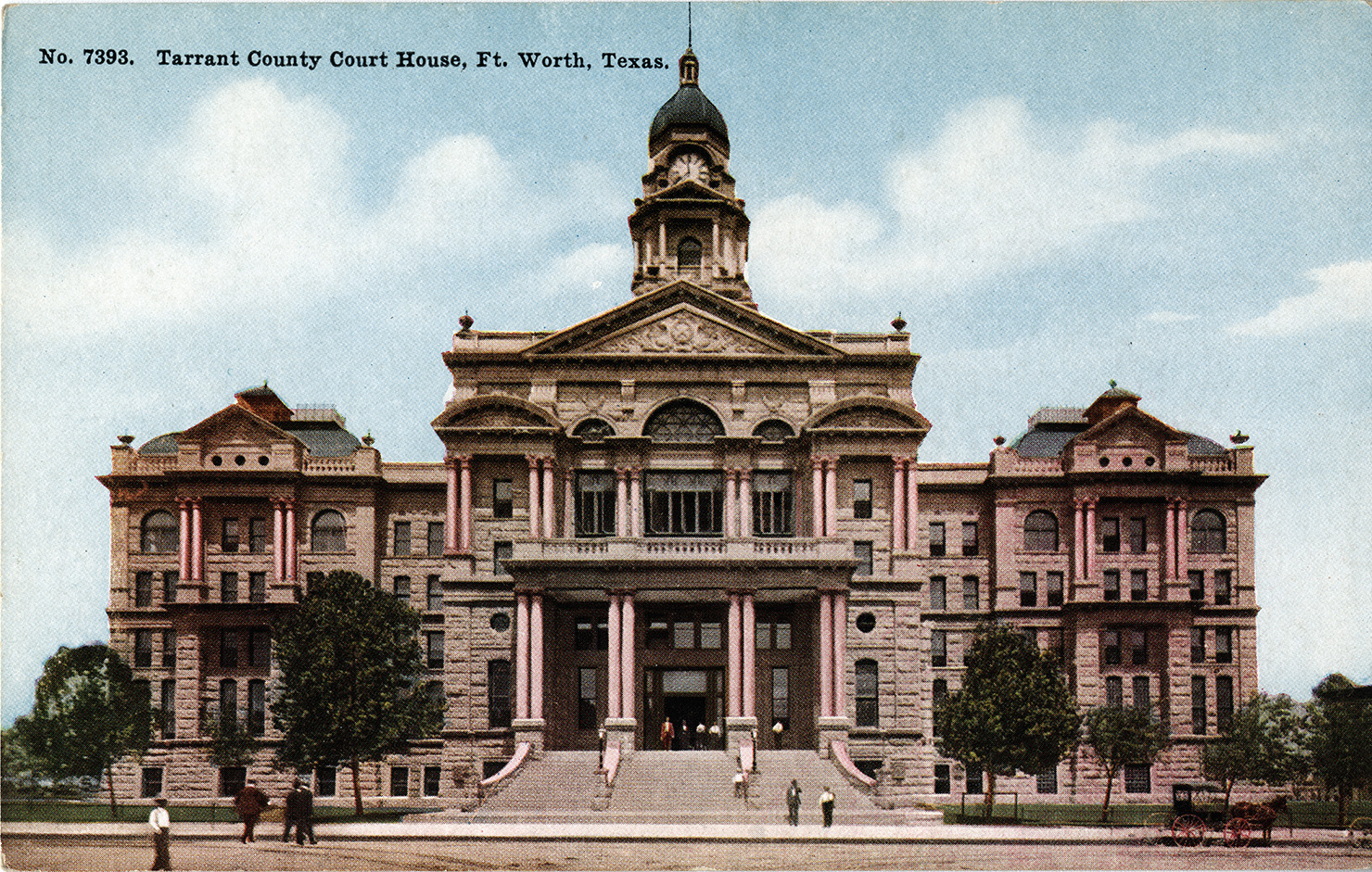
Postcard of the Tarrant County Courthouse, undated

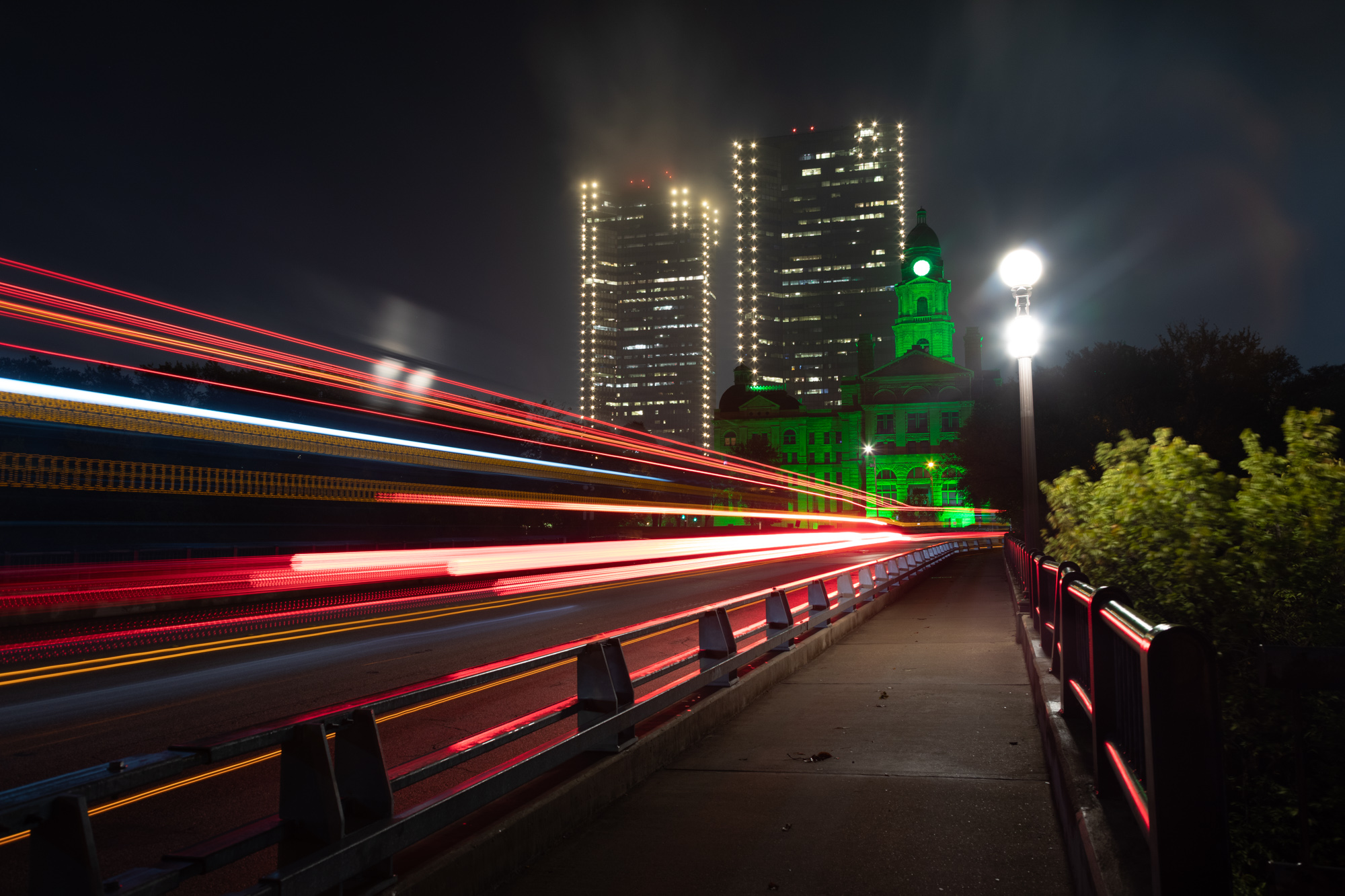
Tarrant County Courthouse viewed from the Paddock Viaduct at night

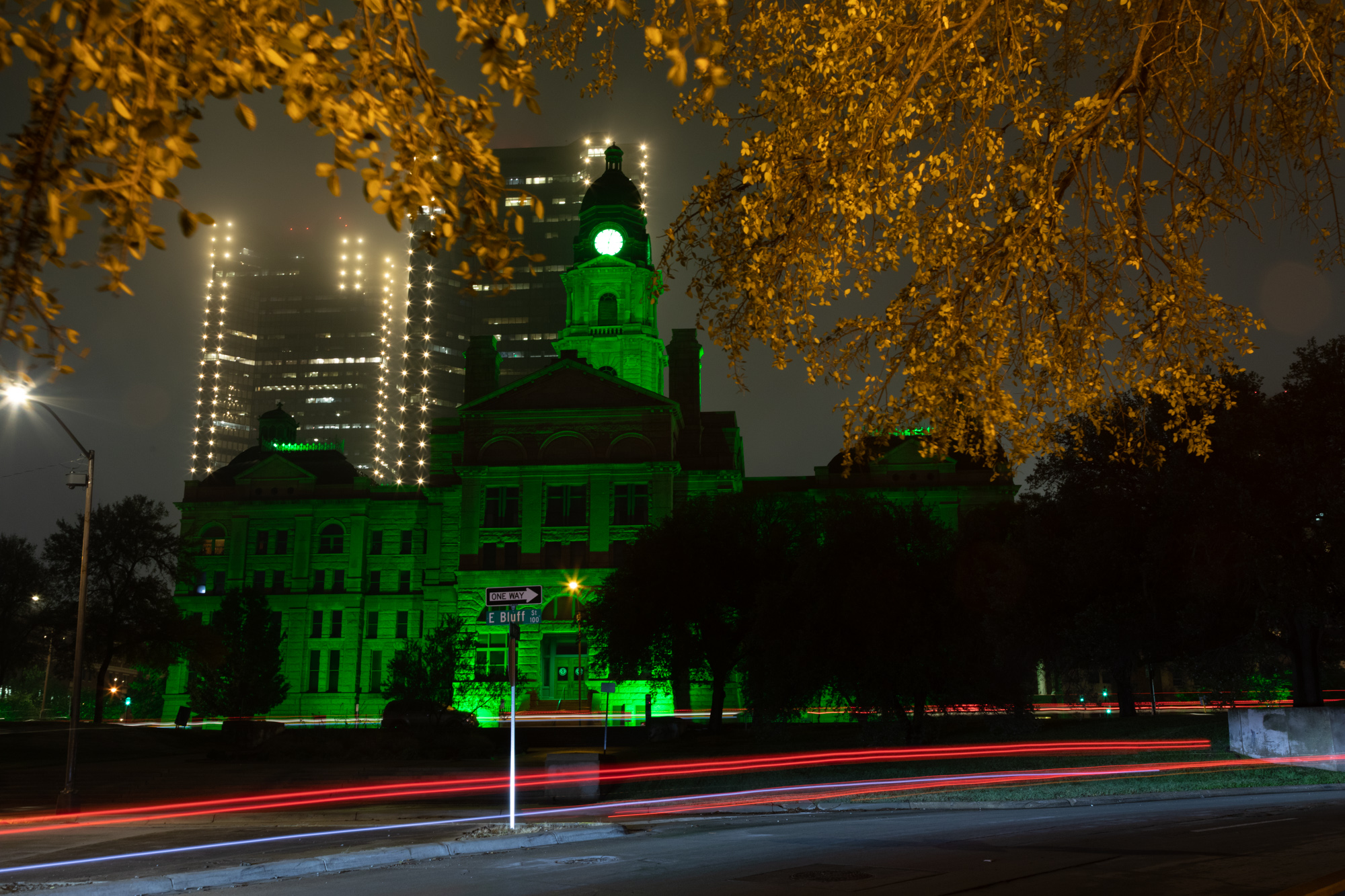
Tarrant County Courthouse viewed from North Houston Street at night

The Tarrant County Courthouse was designed by the architecture firm of Frederick C. Gunn and Louis Curtiss and built by the Probst Construction Company of Chicago, 1893–1895. It is a pink Texas granite building in Renaissance Revival style, closely resembling the Texas State Capitol with the exception of the clock tower. The cost was $408,840 and citizens considered it such a public extravagance that a new County Commissioners' Court was elected in 1894.

A monument dedicated to Confederate Army soldiers was erected on the grounds by the United Daughters of the Confederacy in 1953. In 1958, a Civil Courts Building was constructed on the west side of the courthouse. In 2012, a $4.5 million renovation to the clock tower was completed. In 2013, the Civil Courts Building was demolished.

The Tarrant County Courthouse currently houses the Tarrant County clerk's office, probate and county courts at law, a law library, and the Tarrant County facilities management department.

== In popular culture ==
The courthouse has served as the main setting for the CBS crime drama Walker, Texas Ranger, housing the Ranger office.

== See also ==
- National Register of Historic Places listings in Tarrant County, Texas
- Recorded Texas Historic Landmarks in Tarrant County
- Monument to Confederate war soldiers, Fort Worth

Records
Unknown	Tallest building in Fort Worth; 194 feet (59 m); 1895-1920	Succeeded by W. T. Waggoner Building
