= Goatman (urban legend) =

Legendary creature

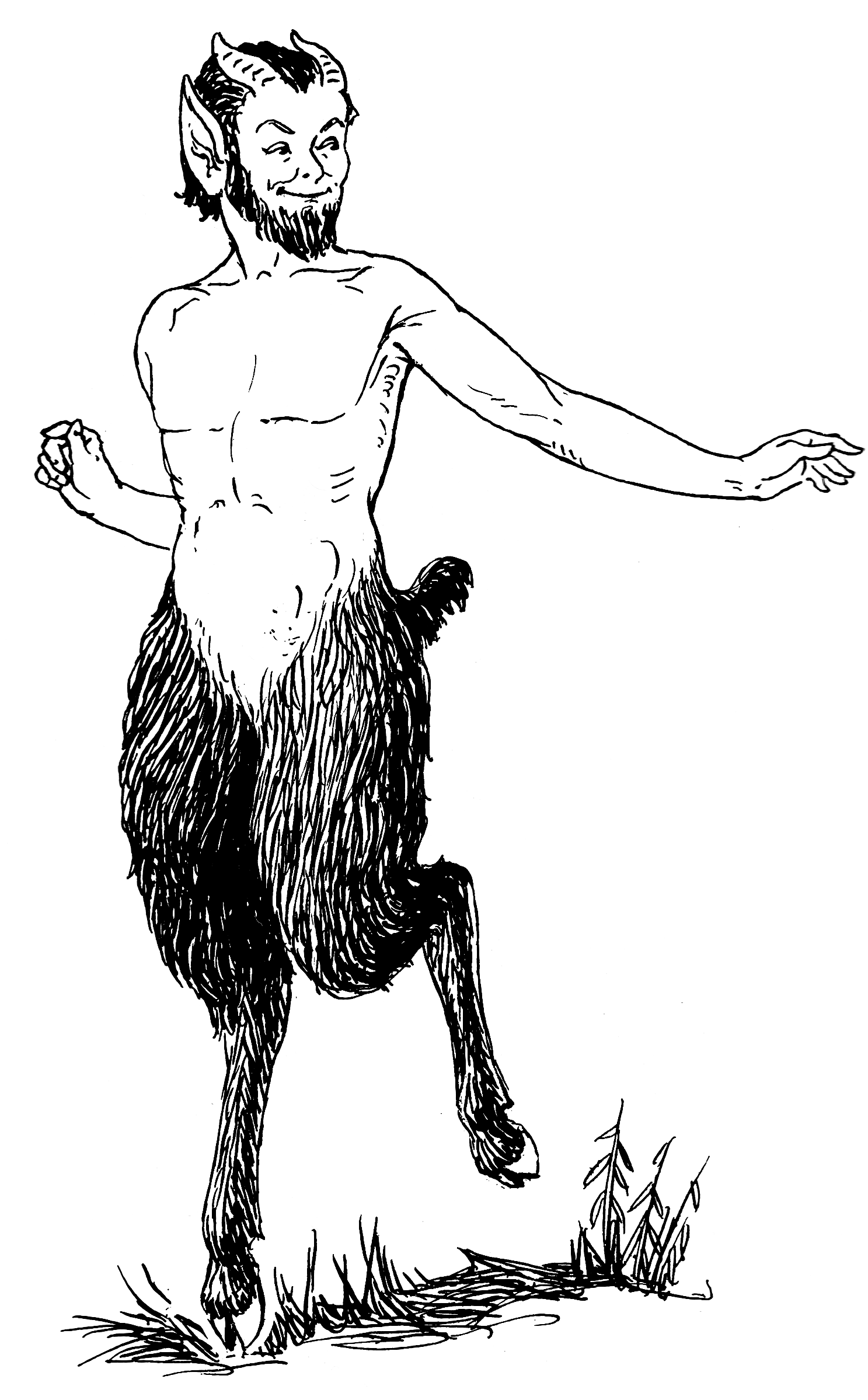
- Goatman was rumored to be similar in appearance to the mythical faun.

Creature information
- Grouping: Cryptid

Origin
- Region: Prince George's County, Maryland

According to urban legend, Goatman is a creature resembling a goat-human hybrid often credited with canine deaths and purported to take refuge in the woods of Prince George's County, Maryland, United States.

== History ==
In May of 1971, University of Maryland student George Lizama completed an undergraduate folklore project on the Goatman that was later added to the Maryland Folklife Archives. In Lizama’s paper, the Goatman was said to be located on Tucker Road in Fort Washington, Maryland. Later the same year, reporter Karen Hosler discovered Lizama’s project in the Maryland Folklife Archives and reported on his paper in the Prince George’s County News in October 1971, this time placing the Goatman near Fletchertown Road in Bowie, Maryland. Additionally, this report covered the theory that the Goatman’s origins can be traced to the Beltsville Agricultural Research Center.

While Goatman stories originated in the early 1970s, some of its legends are set in the late 1930s, within Prince George's County, following the disappearances and/or deaths of multiple dogs, which were later attributed to the creature. However, given the condition of the remains, the deaths may more likely have been the result of passing trains. Despite evidence to the contrary, stories of Goatman's existence continued to circulate, especially among local students. Graffiti reading "Goatman was here" was not uncommon, and law enforcement would habitually receive calls regarding alleged sightings, a number of which were pranks.

The creature was commonly claimed to have a body covered in hair, though possessing the face of a human. However, descriptions differed on whether Goatman greatly resembled a hairy humanoid or a human with the lower portion of a goat, similar to the fauns of Roman mythology.

Goatman was rumored to reside in a makeshift shelter in the wooded region of northeastern Prince George's County near the abandoned trailer parks. Occasionally, it was claimed that Goatman would venture out to kill any living thing, humans and wildlife alike.

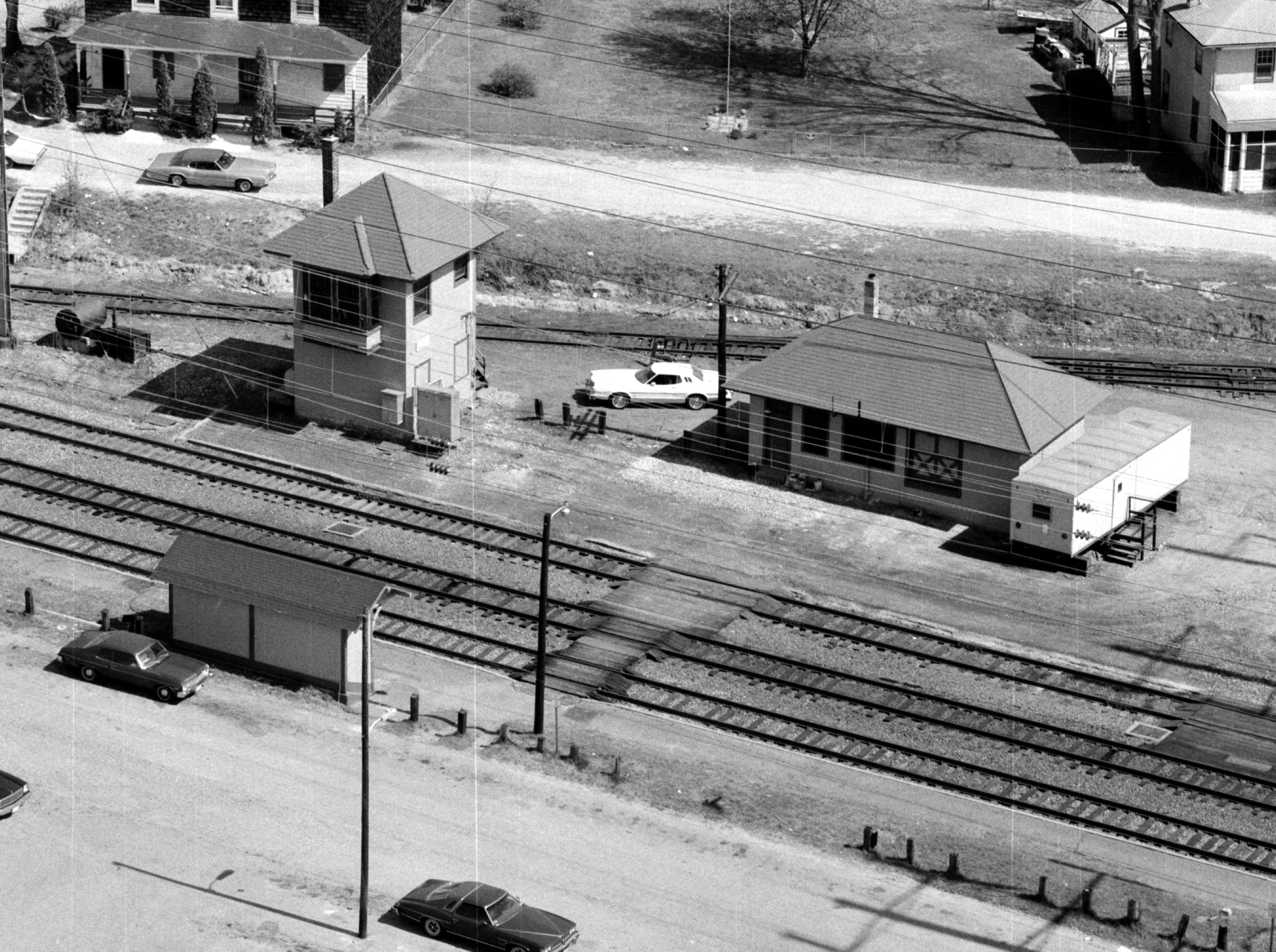
1970s Bowie where a large number of Goatman sightings were reported

== Variations ==
According to some variations of the legend, Goatman is said to have once been a scientist, Dr. Stephen Fletcher, who worked in the Beltsville Agricultural Research Center. In this version, an experiment on goats backfires and the scientist mutates into a half-man, half-goat creature that begins aggressively attacking cars in the vicinity of Beltsville, Maryland. Another variation of the legend holds that Goatman himself was an old hermit who lived in the woods and often could be seen walking alone at night along Fletchertown Road.

According to University of Maryland folklorist Barry Pearson, the Goatman legends began "long, long, long" ago and were further popularized in 1971 when the death of a dog was blamed on Goatman by local residents. Pearson relates that "bored teenagers" keep the Goatman legend alive by repeating the story and suggesting that the creature attacks couples, frequenting the local lover's lane, subsequently stirring interest in sites like Fletchertown Road.

== See also ==
- Satyr/Faun
- Pope Lick Monster (Kentucky's "Goat-Sheepman")
- Lake Worth Monster (Texas Goatman)
- Old Alton Bridge (Goatman's Bridge)
