= Tandy Hills Natural Area =

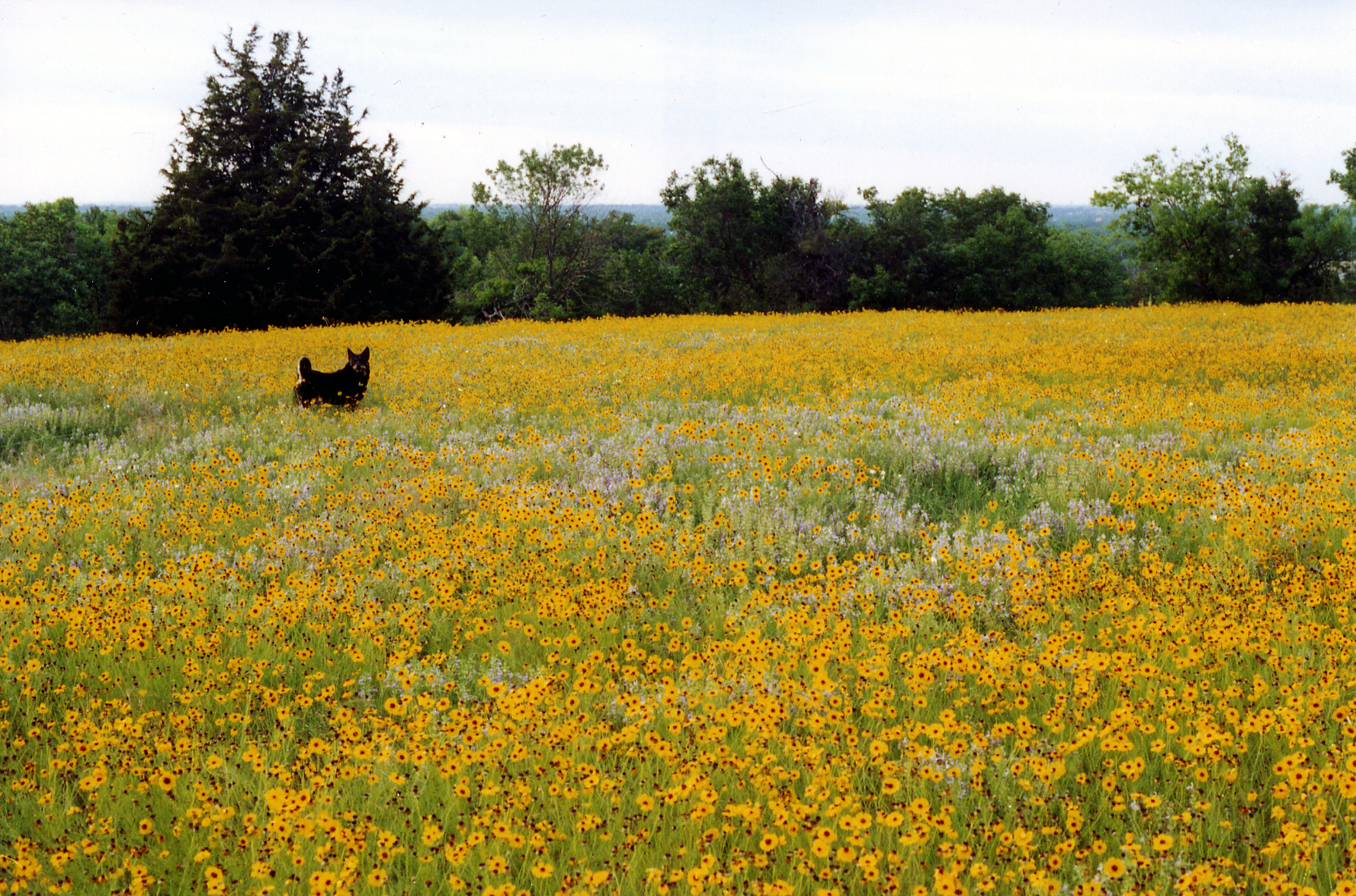
- Tandy Hills

- Location within Texas
- Location: Fort Worth, Texas
- Coordinates: 32°44′53″N 97°16′26″W
- Area: 210 acres (0.85 km^{2})
- Established: 1987
- Website: www.tandyhills.org

Tandy Hills Natural Area (THNA) is a 210-acre (0.85 km^{2}) indigenous remnant prairie located in Fort Worth, Texas. The land was obtained by the City of Fort Worth in 1960 and designated a natural area in 1987.

Noted for its unusually complete collection of prairie flora, THNA contains more than 1200 native species. The show of spring wildflowers is unsurpassed in the Dallas–Fort Worth metroplex. The land is a living demonstration of how most of Fort Worth appeared in predevelopment times.

Tandy Hills is adjacent to Interstate 30 and less than 5 miles from Downtown Fort Worth. The fact that it has never been developed and survived into the 21st century in relatively pristine condition is remarkable.

In June 2020, the city of Fort Worth purchased 50+ acres of land adjacent to Tandy Hills dubbed "Broadcast Hill," for $610,000. The Friends of Tandy Hills Natural Area, a non-profit organization, contributed more than $64,000 to the purchase from their Broadcast Hill fundraising drive. The addition of Broadcast Hill makes Tandy Hills one of the largest urban open space areas in the nation.
