= Lake Worth (Texas) =

Lake on the Trinity River in Fort Worth, Texas

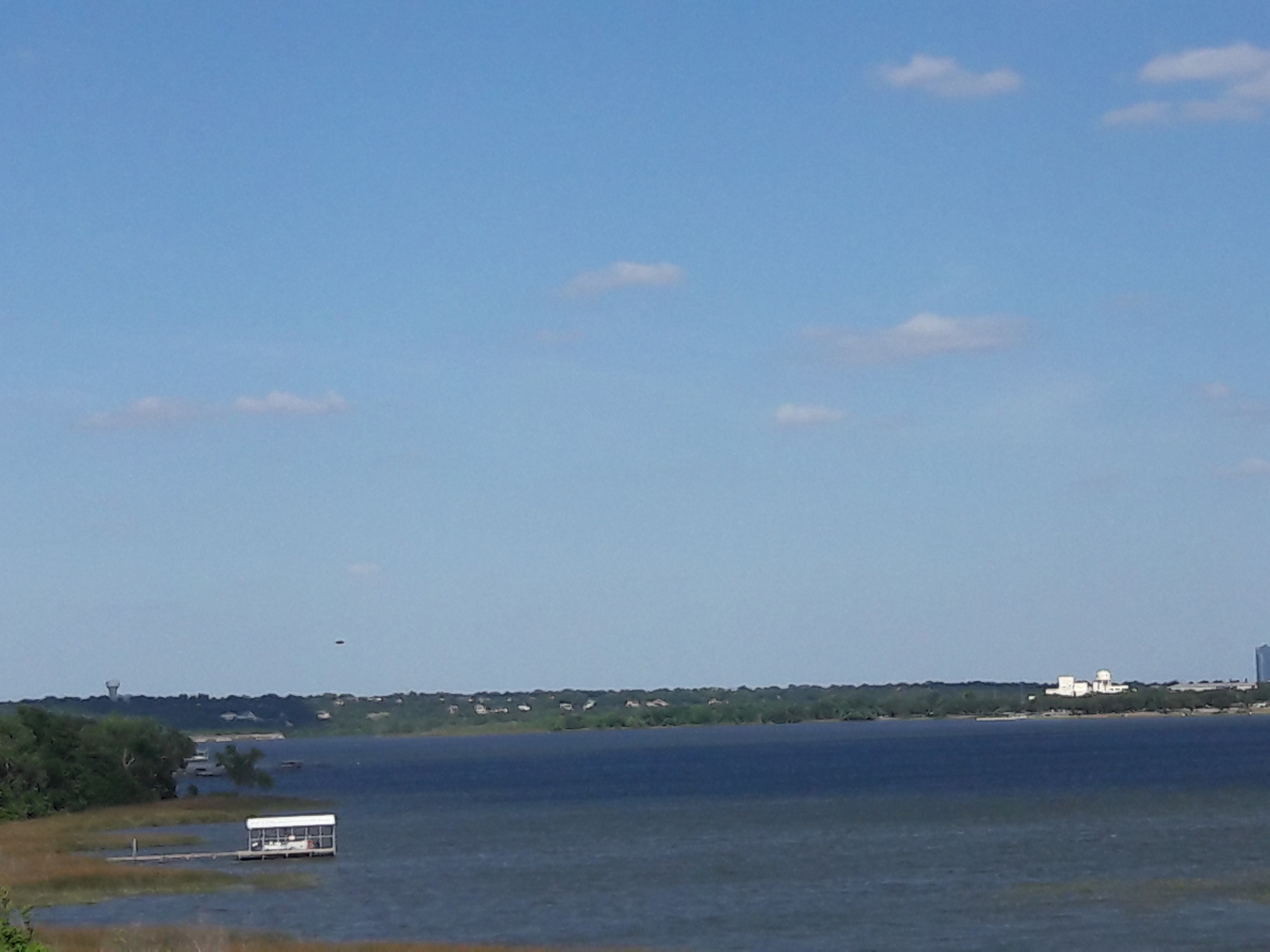
- Lake Worth, 2020

- Location within Texas Location within the United States
- Location: Fort Worth, Tarrant County, Texas, United States
- Coordinates: 32°47′26″N 97°24′53″W
- Type: Artificial
- Primary inflows: Eagle Mountain Lake
- Primary outflows: Trinity River
- Basin countries: United States
- Surface area: 3,489 acres (1,412 ha)
- Average depth: 6 ft (1.8 m)
- Max. depth: 22 ft (6.7 m)
- Surface elevation: 594 ft (181 m)
- Islands: Greer Island, Willow Island, Goat Island
- Settlements: Fort Worth, Texas

Lake Worth is located on the West Fork of the Trinity River. It is entirely inside the city limits of Fort Worth, Texas, United States.

== History and development ==
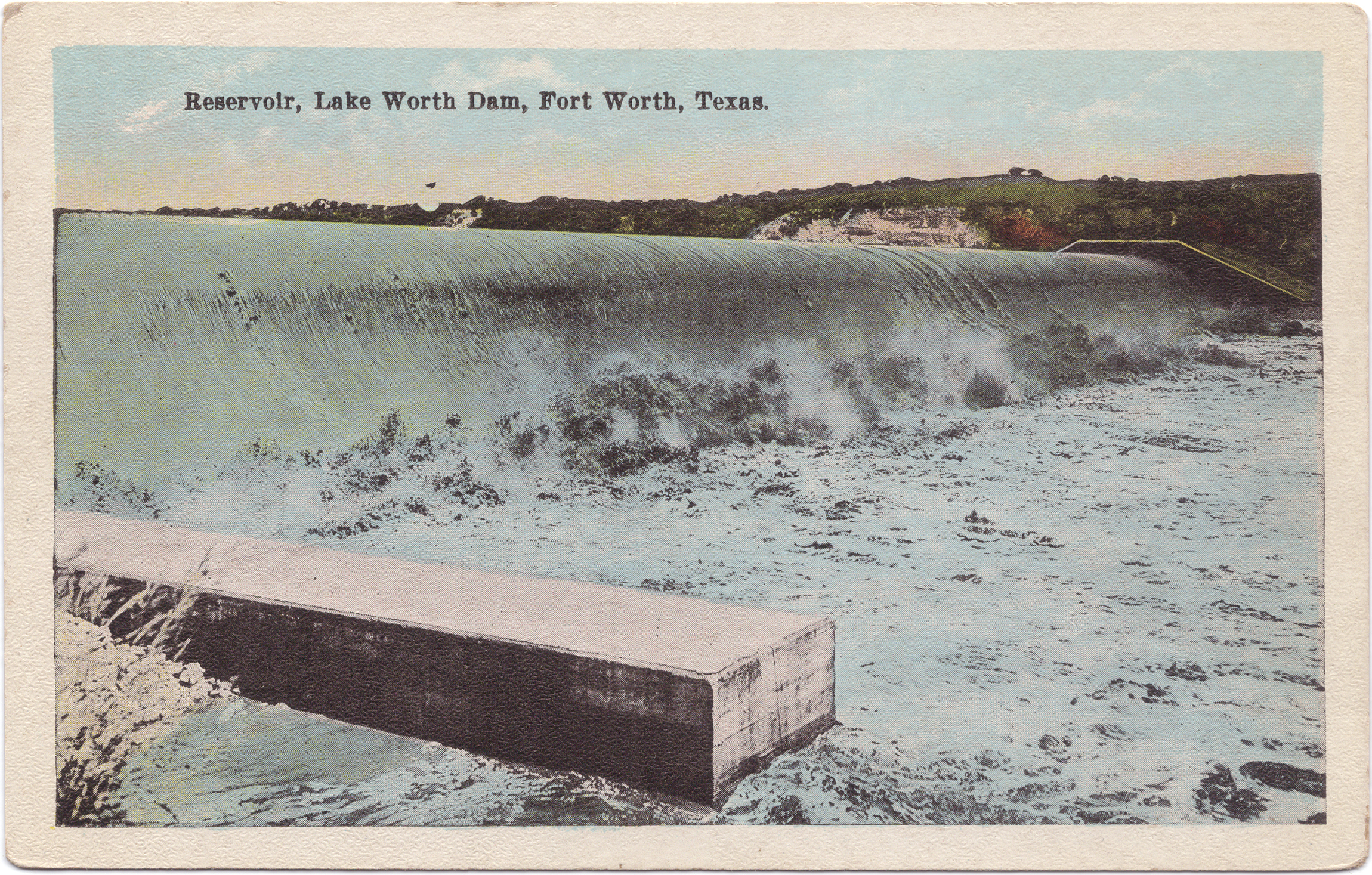
Lake Worth Dam, undated

Lake Worth was built in 1914 as a reservoir and for recreation. The property is owned by the City of Fort Worth, while the Tarrant Regional Water District controls the reservoir's water rights. The lake has a moderate fluctuation with stained clarity. Submerged vegetation is sparse. There are shallow flats covered with cattails and other emergent species.

When first impounded, Lake Worth provided boating and recreation that drew people from throughout the North Texas area. Over time, the lake became more neglected, but the expansion of Fort Worth has recently brought the lake and its parks new popularity.

Since the early 1960s, many calls were made for dredging the lake and restoring its recreational potential, but city leaders were either unwilling or unable to fund the expensive proposition. This funding problem ended in the mid-2000s, when it became technologically feasible to access natural gas of the Barnett Shale, which partially lies underneath the lake.

A movement of Fort Worth citizens has pushed for retaining a portion of that gas revenue windfall for renovating and developing its public recreational potential. This movement proposes to make improvements such as dredging the lake, setting aside 400 acres (1.6 km^{2}) of additional city-owned land as green space, building trails and other recreational infrastructure, and integrating the overall area into a "world-class" park such as New York's Central Park (the city currently operates a 3,000-acre (12 km^{2}) park on the lake's northern end as the Fort Worth Nature Center and Refuge. A capital improvement plan and vision plan have been developed to address development of Lake Worth and surrounding property.

== Mythology ==
Lake Worth is considered the site of one of the best documented cryptozoology sightings. In July 1969, a large creature was sighted by numerous people over several days. The creature was described as part goat, part fish, part man. The locals refer to the animal as the "Lake Worth Monster" or the "Lake Worth Goatman".

== See also ==
- Casino Beach (Fort Worth, Texas)
- Trinity River Authority
