= Eupetale =

Scientific classification
- Kingdom: Animalia
- Phylum: Arthropoda
- Clade: Pancrustacea
- Class: Insecta
- Order: Coleoptera
- Suborder: Polyphaga
- Infraorder: Cucujiformia
- Family: Chrysomelidae
- Subfamily: Eumolpinae
- Tribe: Eumolpini
- Genus: Eupetale; Flowers, 2021

Type species
- Lycaste trichoa Gistel, 1848

Genus of leaf beetles

Eupetale is a genus of leaf beetles in the subfamily Eumolpinae. It contains two species known from South America.

The original name used for this genus was Lycaste, established by Gistel in 1848 as a replacement name for Chalcophana, which was later found to be unnecessary. Additionally, Gistel himself had first used Lycaste in 1834 for a jewel beetle genus (today a synonym of Polycesta), and Agassiz had used Lycaste in 1846 to emend Savigny's 1816 amphipod crustacean genus name Lycesta (a synonym of Leucothoe today).

In 2021, Flowers proposed a new name for the genus, Eupetale, for the two species formerly placed in Gistel's Lycaste. Under the name Lycaste, Callicolaspis was formerly considered a synonym of the genus, but in 2003 Callicolaspis was restored as a separate genus.

The genus is named after Eupetale from Greek mythology, who was one of the nurses of Dionysus and a sister of Lycaste.

== Species ==
The genus contains only two species:

- Eupetale eumolpoides (Lefèvre, 1877) – Peru, Bolivia, Brazil, Ecuador, Argentina
- Eupetale trichoa (Gistel, 1848) (= Prionodera metallica Jacoby, 1884) – Brazil
