= Maenad =

Female follower of Dionysus

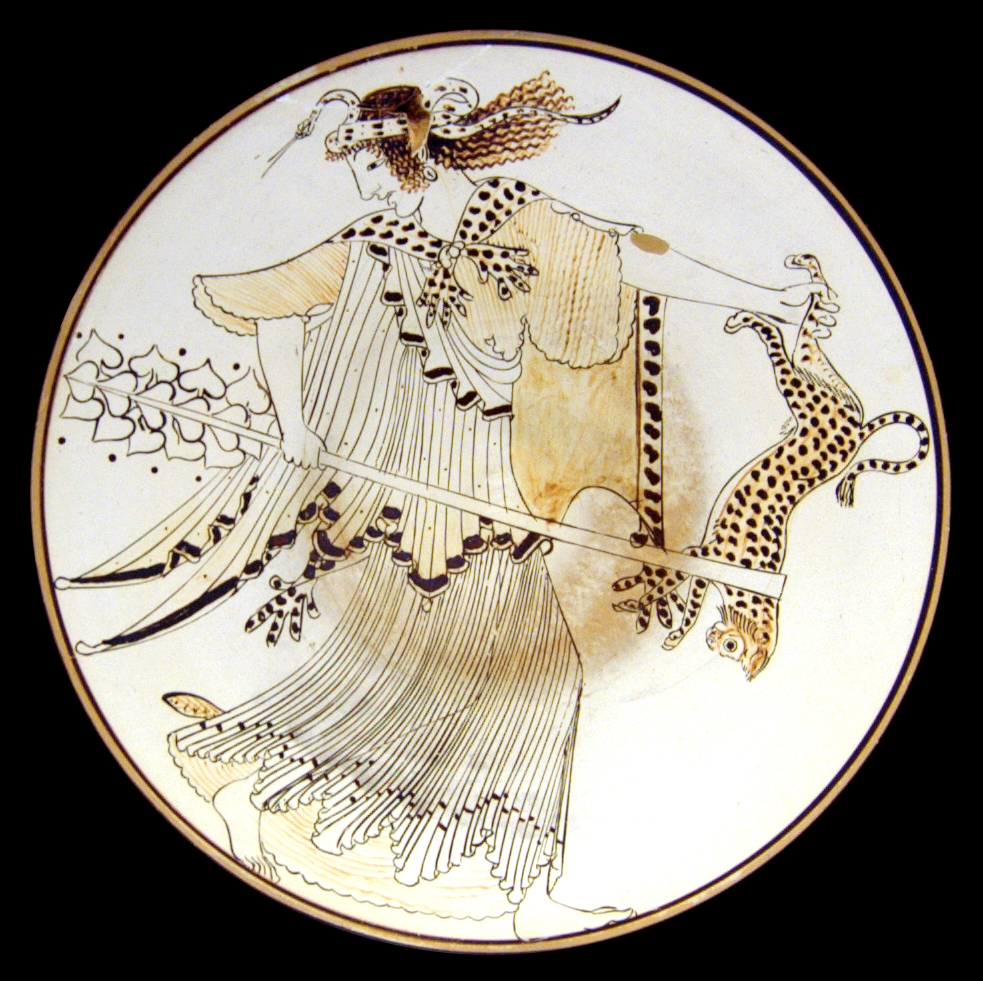
Maenad carrying a thyrsus and a leopard with a snake rolled up over her head. Tondo of an ancient Greek Attic white-ground kylix 490–480 BC from Vulci. Staatliche Antikensammlungen, Munich, Germany.

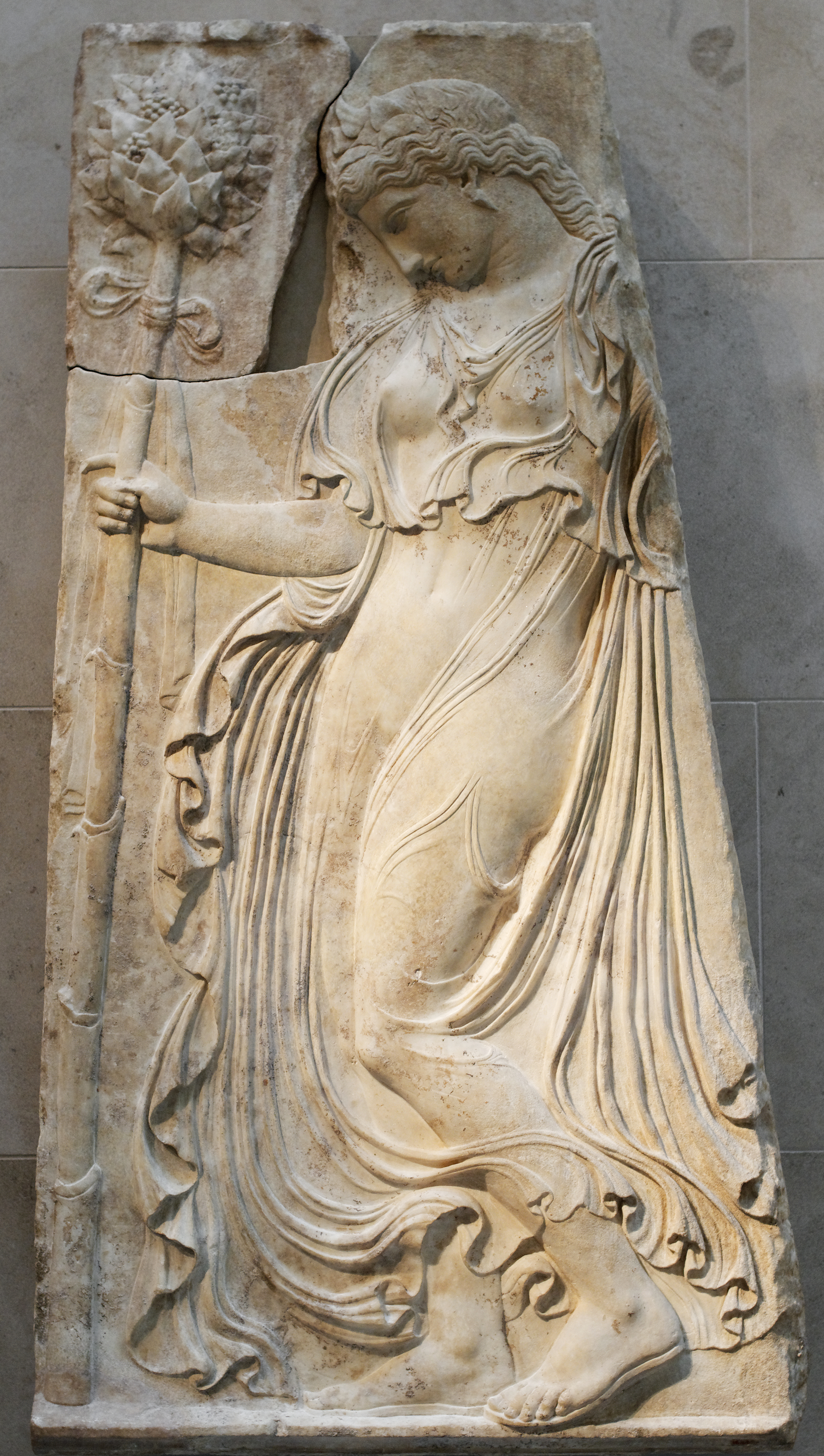
Dancing Maenad. Roman copy of Greek original attributed to Kallimachos c. 425–400 BC at the Metropolitan Museum of Art

In Greek mythology, maenads (/ˈmiːnædz/; Ancient Greek: μαινάδες [maiˈnades]) were the female followers of Dionysus and the most significant members of his retinue, the thiasus. Their name, which comes from μαίνομαι (maínomai, "to rave, to be mad; to rage, to be angry"), literally translates as 'raving ones'. Maenads were known as Bassarids, Bacchae /ˈbækiː/, or Bacchantes /ˈbækənts, bəˈkænts, -ˈkɑːnts/ in Roman mythology after the penchant of the equivalent Roman god, Bacchus, to wear a bassaris or fox skin.

Often the maenads were portrayed as inspired by Dionysus into a state of ecstatic frenzy through a combination of dancing and intoxication. During these rites, the maenads would dress in fawn skins and carry a thyrsus, a long stick wrapped in ivy or vine leaves and tipped with a pine cone. They would weave ivy-wreaths around their heads, and often handle or wear snakes.

== Maenads according to writers ==
These women were mythologized as the "mad women" who were nurses of Dionysus in Nysa. Lycurgus "chased the Nurses of the frenzied Dionysus through the holy hills of Nysa, and the sacred implements dropped to the ground from the hands of one and all, as the murderous Lycurgus struck them down with his ox-goad". They went into the mountains at night and practised strange rites.

According to Plutarch's Life of Alexander, maenads were called Mimallones and Klodones in Macedon, epithets derived from the feminine art of spinning wool. Nevertheless, these warlike parthenoi ("virgins") from the hills, associated with a Dionysios pseudanor ("fake male Dionysus"), routed an invading enemy. In southern Greece they were described as Bacchae, Bassarides, Thyiades, Potniades, and other epithets.

The term maenad has come to be associated with a wide variety of women, supernatural, mythological, and historical, associated with the god Dionysus and his worship.

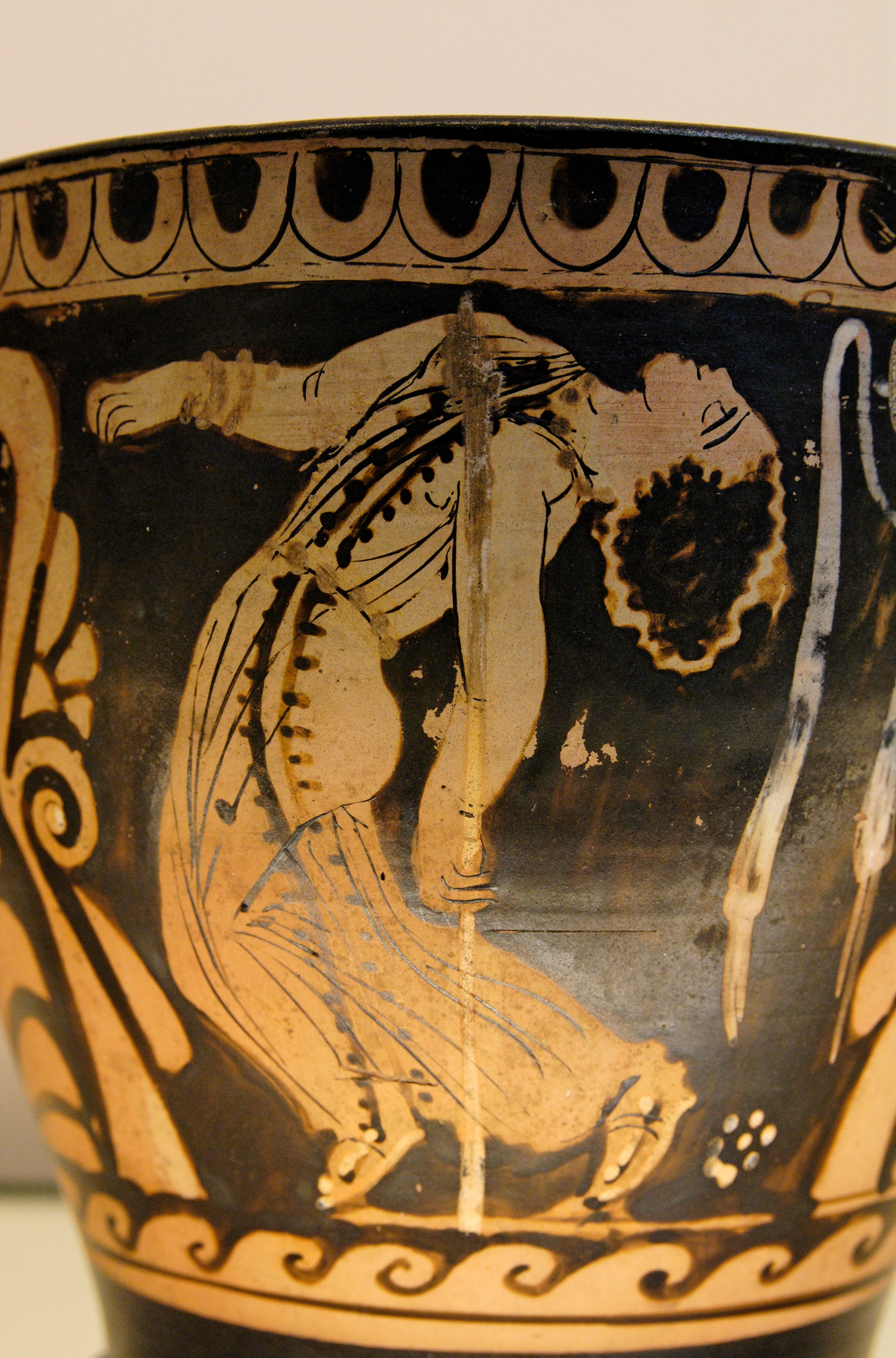
Dancing maenad. Detail from an ancient Greek Paestum red figure skyphos, made by Python, c. 330–320 BC, British Museum, London.

In Euripides' play The Bacchae, maenads of Thebes murder King Pentheus after he bans the worship of Dionysus. Dionysus, Pentheus' cousin, himself lures Pentheus to the woods, where the maenads tear him apart. His corpse is mutilated by his own mother, Agave, who tears off his head, believing it to be that of a lion. A group of maenads also kill Orpheus, when he refuses to entertain them while mourning his dead wife.

In ceramic art, the frolicking of Maenads and Dionysus is often a theme depicted on kraters, used to mix water and wine. These scenes show the maenads in their frenzy running in the forests, often tearing to pieces any animal they happen to come across.

German philologist Walter Friedrich Otto writes:

The Bacchae of Euripides gives us the most vital picture of the wonderful circumstance in which, as Plato says in the Ion, the god-intoxicated celebrants draw milk and honey from the streams. They strike rocks with the thyrsus, and water gushes forth. They lower the thyrsus to the earth, and a spring of wine bubbles up. If they want milk, they scratch up the ground with their fingers and draw up the milky fluid. Honey trickles down from the thyrsus made of the wood of the ivy, they gird themselves with snakes and give suck to fawns and wolf cubs as if they were infants at the breast. Fire does not burn them. No weapon of iron can wound them, and the snakes harmlessly lick up the sweat from their heated cheeks. Fierce bulls fall to the ground, victims to numberless, tearing female hands, and sturdy trees are torn up by the roots with their combined efforts.

== Cult worship ==
=== Bacchanalia ===
Cultist rites associated with the worship of the Greek god of wine, Dionysus (or Bacchus in Roman mythology), were characterized by maniacal dancing to the sound of loud music and crashing cymbals, in which the revelers, called Bacchantes, whirled, screamed, became drunk and incited one another to greater and greater ecstasy. The goal was to achieve a state of enthusiasm in which the celebrants' souls were temporarily freed from their earthly bodies and were able to commune with Bacchus/Dionysus and gain a glimpse of and a preparation for what they would someday experience in eternity. The rite climaxed in a performance of frenzied feats of strength and madness, such as uprooting trees, tearing a bull (the symbol of Dionysus) apart with their bare hands, an act called sparagmos, and eating its flesh raw, an act called omophagia. This latter rite was a sacrament akin to communion in which the participants assumed the strength and character of the god by symbolically eating the raw flesh and drinking the blood of his symbolic incarnation. Having symbolically eaten his body and drunk his blood, the celebrants became possessed by Dionysus.

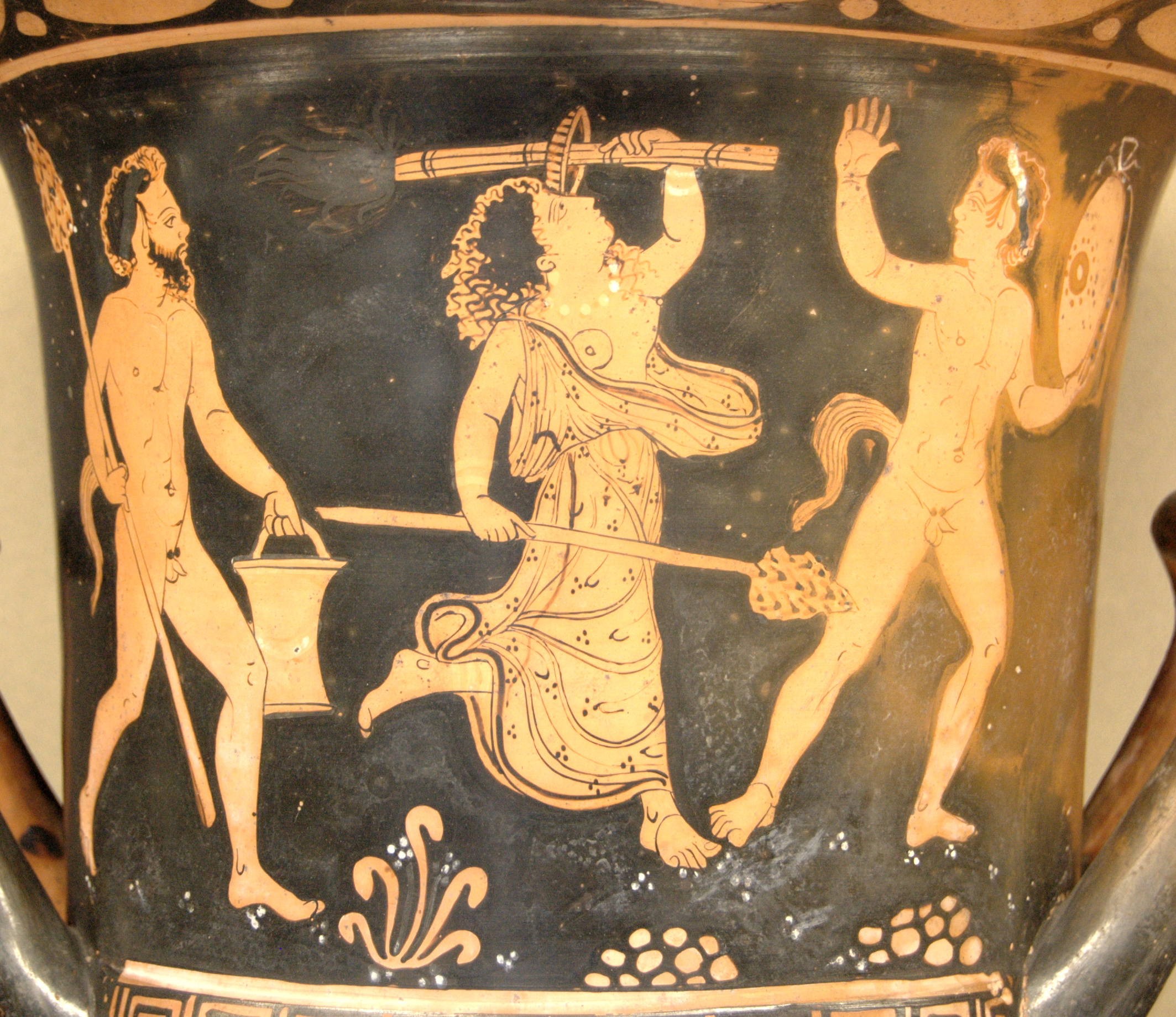
Two satyrs and a maenad. Side A from an ancient Greek red figure calyx-krater from Apulia, 380–370 BC. Louvre, Paris.

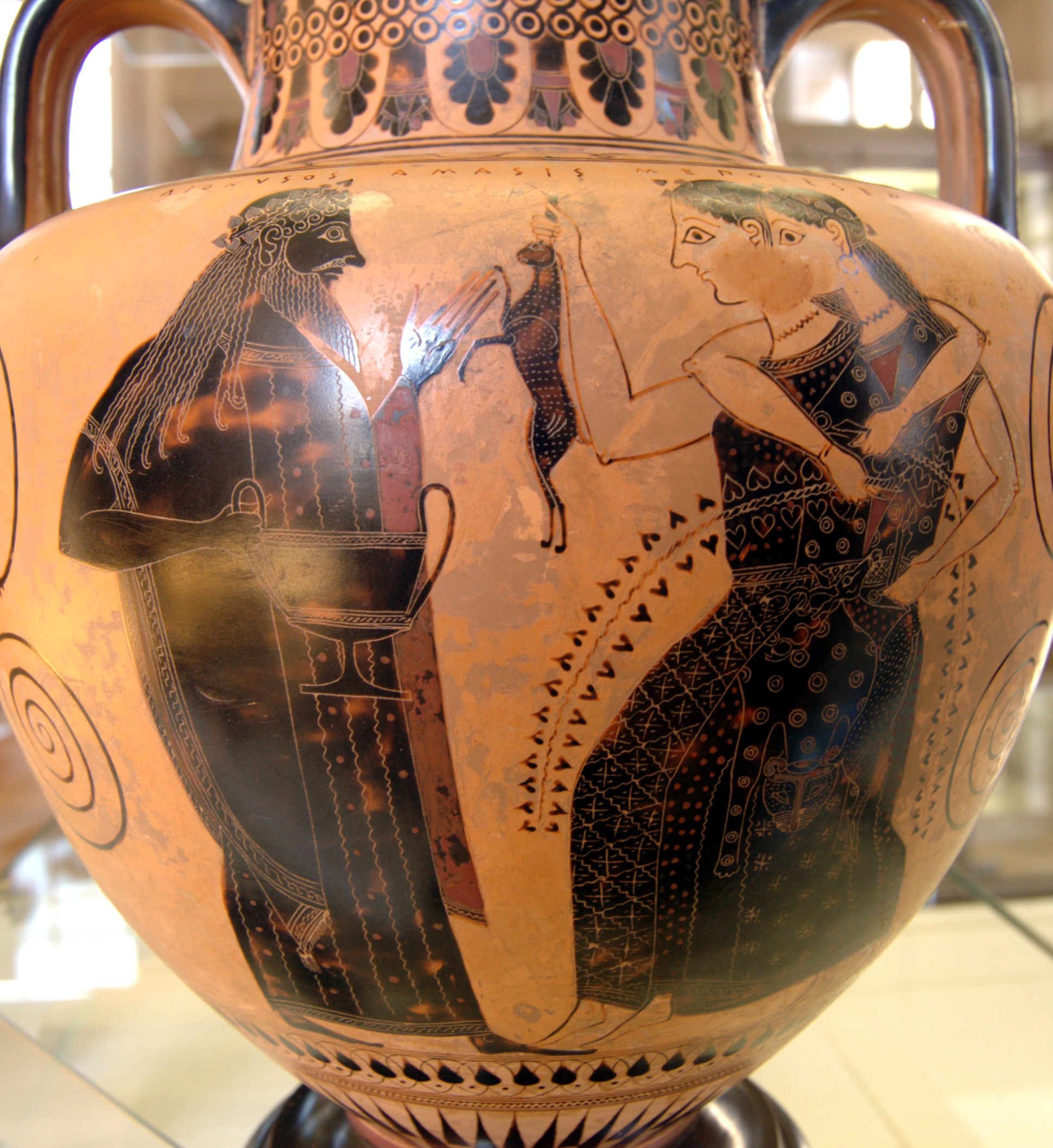
Dionysus and two maenads as depicted by the Amasis Painter circa 550–530 BC.

=== Priestesses of Dionysus ===
Maenads are found in later references as priestesses of the Dionysian cult. In the third century BC, when the city of Magnesia wanted to establish a maenadic cult in honour of Dionysus, the Delphic Oracle bade them, "Go to the holy plain of Thebes to fetch maenads from the race of Cadmean Ino. They will bring you maenadic rites and noble customs and will establish troops of Bacchus in your city."

== Myths ==
Dionysus came to his birthplace, Thebes, where neither Pentheus, his cousin who was now king, nor Pentheus' mother Agave, Dionysus' aunt (Semele's sister) acknowledged his divinity. Dionysus punished Agave by driving her insane, and in that condition, she killed her son and tore him to pieces. From Thebes, Dionysus went to Argos where all the women except the daughters of King Proetus joined in his worship. Dionysus punished them by driving them mad, and they killed the infants who were nursing at their breasts. He did the same to the daughters of Minyas, King of Orchomenos in Boetia, and then turned them into bats.

According to Oppian, Dionysus delighted, as a child, in tearing kids into pieces and bringing them back to life again. He is characterized as "the raging one" and "the mad one" and the nature of the maenads, from which they get their name, is, therefore, his nature.

Once during a war in the middle of the third century BC, the entranced Thyiades (maenads) lost their way and arrived in Amphissa, a city near Delphi. There they sank down exhausted in the market place and were overpowered by a deep sleep. The women of Amphissa formed a protective ring around them and when they awoke arranged for them to return home unmolested.

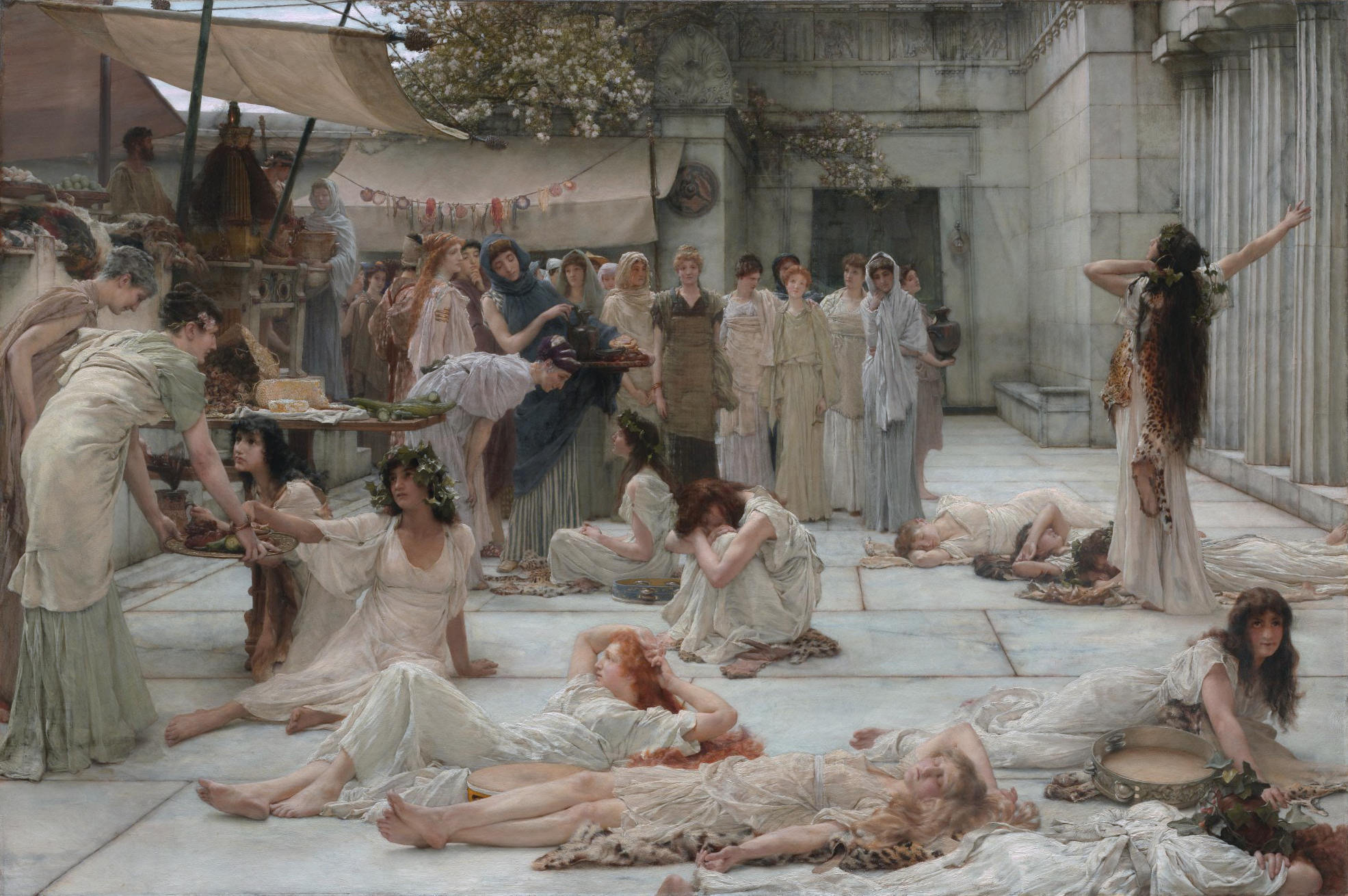
The Women of Amphissa by Lawrence Alma-Tadema

On another occasion, the Thyiades were snowed in on Parnassos and it was necessary to send a rescue party. The clothing of the men who took part in the rescue froze solid. It is unlikely that the Thyiades, even if they wore deerskins over their shoulders, were ever dressed more warmly than the men.

=== Nurses and nymphs ===
In the realm of the supernatural is the category of nymphs who nurse and care for the young Dionysus, and continue in his worship as he comes of age. The god Hermes is said to have carried the young Dionysus to the nymphs of Nysa.

In another myth, when his mother, Semele, is killed, the care of young Dionysus falls into the hands of his sisters, Ino, Agave, and Autonoë, who later are depicted as participating in the rites and taking a leadership role among the other maenads.

=== Resisters to the new religion ===
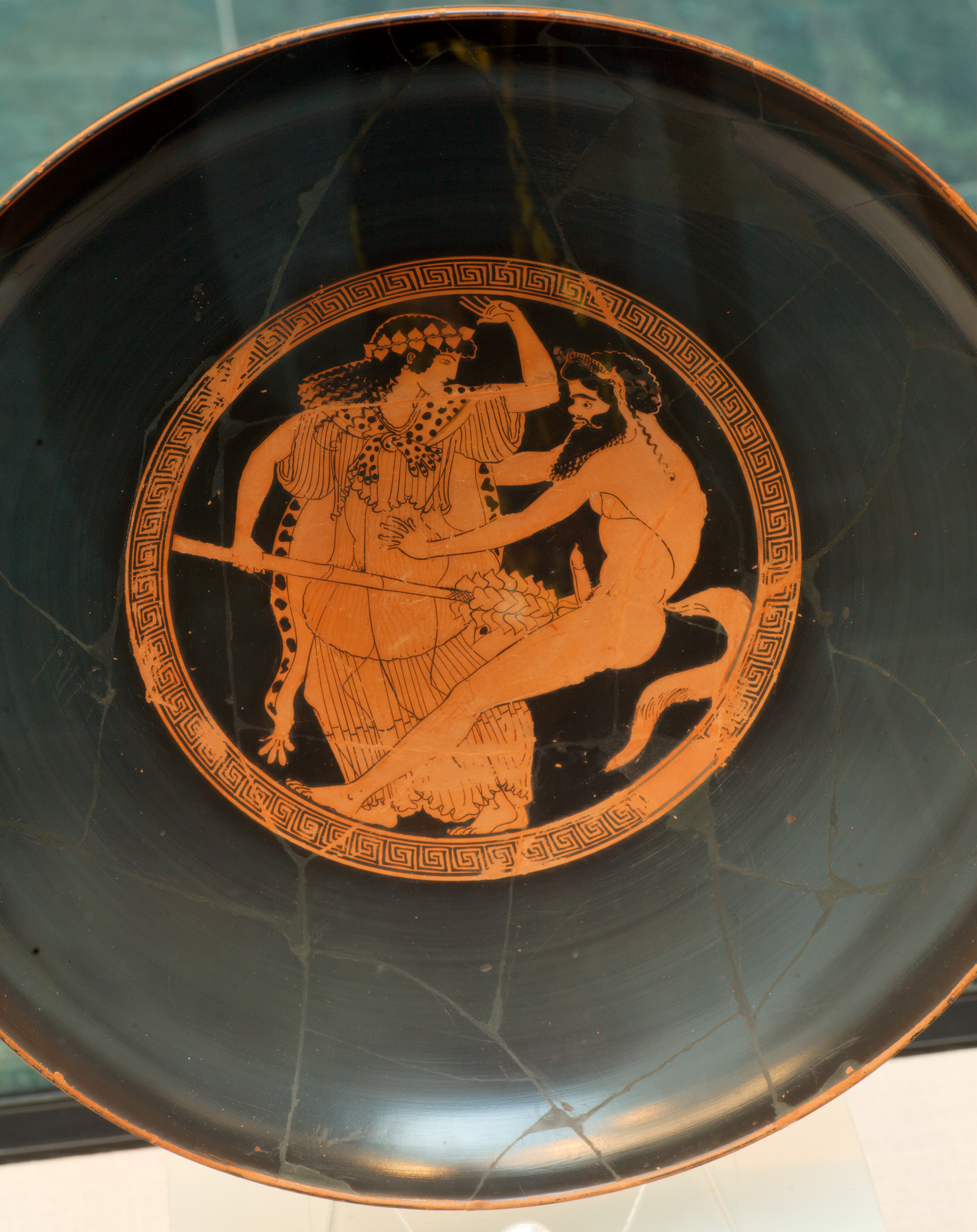
Maenad and satyr. Ancient Greek kylix by Makron, 490-480 BC. Staatliche Antikensammlungen München Kat. 94

The term "maenads" also refers to women in mythology who resisted the worship of Dionysus and were driven mad by him, forced against their will to participate in often horrific rites. The doubting women of Thebes, the prototypical maenads or "mad women", left their homes to live in the wilds of the nearby mountain Cithaeron. When they discovered Pentheus spying on them, dressed as a maenad, they tore him limb from limb.

This also occurs with the three daughters of Minyas, who reject Dionysus and remain true to their household duties, becoming startled by invisible drums, flutes, cymbals, and seeing ivy hanging down from their looms. As punishment for their resistance, they become madwomen, choosing the child of one of their number by lot and tearing it to pieces, as the women on the mountain did to young animals. A similar story with a tragic end is told of the daughters of Proetus.

=== Voluntary revelers ===
Not all women were inclined to resist the call of Dionysus, however. Maenads, possessed by the spirit of Dionysus, traveled with him from Thrace to mainland Greece in his quest for the recognition of his divinity. Dionysus was said to have danced down from Parnassos accompanied by Delphic virgins, and it is known that even as young girls the women in Boeotia practiced not only the closed rites but also the bearing of the thyrsus and the dances.

A possible foundation myth is the ancient festival called Agrionia. According to Greek authors like Plutarch, female followers of Dionysios went in search of him and when they could not find him prepared a feast. As Plutarch records this festival, a priest would chase a group of virgins down with a sword. These women were supposed to be descendants of the women who sacrificed their son in the name of Dionysios. The priest would catch one of the women and execute her. This human sacrifice was later omitted from the festival. Eventually the women would be freed from the intense ecstatic experience of the festival and return to their usual lives. The Agrionia was celebrated in several Greek cities, but especially in Boeotia. Each Boeotian city had its own distinct foundation myth for it, but the pattern was much the same: the arrival of Dionysus, resistance to him, flight of the women to a mountain, the killing of Dionysus' persecutor, and eventual reconciliation with the god.

== List of maenads ==
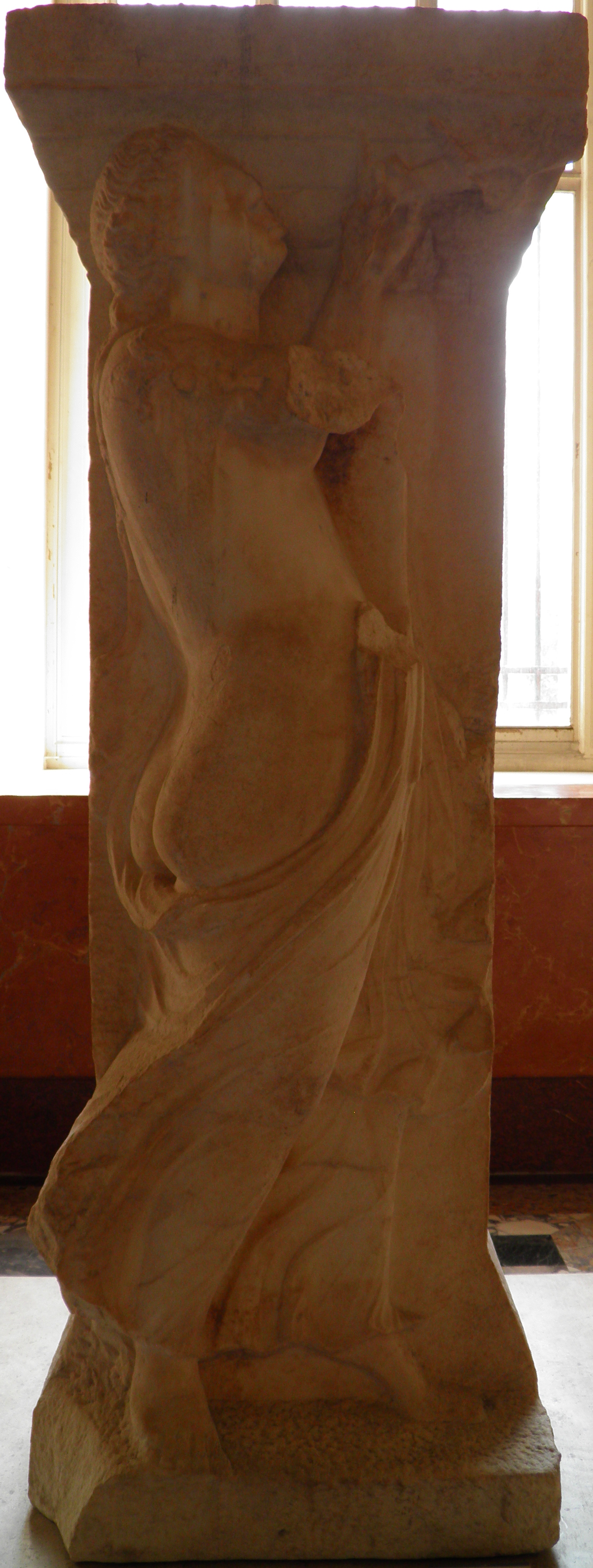
Maenad of Las Incantadas from the agora of Thessalonica, 2nd century, Louvre.

- Alcimacheia – daughter of Harpalion and a maenad from Lemnos who followed Dionysus in his Indian campaign. She was killed during the Indian war by Morrheus, an Indian general son of Didnasos.
- Bromie – one of the maenads who tried to kill Lycurgus.
- Calybe – another follower of Dionysus in the Indian War.
- Chalcomede – when she followed Dionysus in his Indian campaign, the Indian general Morrheus, hit by one of Eros' arrows, fell in love with her, and when he was about to seize her a serpent darted out of her bosom to protect her.
- Charopeia – leader of the Bacchic dance. She followed Dionysus in his Indian campaign.
- Chorea – followed Dionysus in his expedition against Argos. Perseus is said to have put all the women to the sword, including Chorea, but since she had a higher rank she was not buried in a common grave, but had a tomb apart, which some consider a great honor, although nothing tangible or of any benefit for the dead man or woman appears to come from it. And the memory is kept of many who do not have a tomb.
- Cisseis – one of the maenads who tried to kill Lycurgus.
- Clite – one of the maenads who tried to kill Lycurgus.
- Codone – a follower of Dionysus in the Indian war. She was killed by Morrheus.
- Coronis – a Thessalian who was raped by Butes, a Thracian. The latter had plotted against his brother, Lycurgus, and had to go in exile. Having traveled through the Cyclades, he and his companions came to Thessaly. There they met the maenads who fled in fright as the men rushed upon them. However Butes seized Coronis and raped her, and she, angry at the seizure and the treatment she received, called upon Dionysus, who, hearing her prayer, drove him mad. Butes then threw himself into a well and died.
- Eriphe – one of the maenads who tried to kill Lycurgus.
- Eurypyle – a follower of Dionysus in the Indian war. She was killed by Morrheus.
- Gigarto – one of the maenads who tried to kill Lycurgus. She was killed by Morrheus.
- Gorge – one of the followers of Dionysus in the Indian War.
- Melictaina – one of the followers of Dionysus in the Indian War.
- Myrto – one of the followers of Dionysus in the Indian War.
- Nyse – one of the followers of Dionysus in the Indian War.
- Oenone – one of the followers of Dionysus in the Indian War.
- Phasyleia – a maid in the train of Methe. She was the leader of the Bacchanal dance. After Methe the surfeit of wine (drunkenness) was called. Methe was married to King Staphylus of Assyria, who entertained Dionysus in his palace; after him the carryberry bunch of grapes was called.
- Phlio – one of the maenads who tried to kill Lycurgus.
- Polyxo – one of the maenads who tried to kill Lycurgus.
- Soe – one of the maenads who joined Dionysus in his Indian campaign. She was killed by the Indian general Morrheus.
- Staphyle – one of the followers of Dionysus in the Indian War. Killed by Morrheus.
- Sterope – one of the followers of Dionysus in the Indian War. Killed by Morrheus.
- Terpsichore – a dancing maenad who followed Dionysus in the Indian War and drove away the Indian army with her dance.
- Theope – one of the maenads who tried to kill Lycurgus.

The names of the maenads according to various vase paintings were: Anthe ("Flower"), Bacche, Kale ("Beauty"), Kalyke ("Bud"), Choiros ("Pig"), Choro ("Dance"), Chrysis ("Gold"), Kisso ("Ivy"), Klyto, Komodia ("Comedy"), Dorkis, Doro, Eudia ("Calm"), Eudaimonia ("Happiness"), Euthymia ("Good Cheer"), Erophyllis, Galene ("Calm"), Hebe ("Youth"), lo, Kraipale, Lilaia, Mainas, Makaria ("Blessed"), Molpe ("Song"), Myro, Naia, Nymphaia, Nymphe, Opora ("Harvest"), Oinanthe, Oreias ("Mountain-Nymph"), Paidia, Pannychis ("All-night Revel"), Periklymene ("Renowned"), Phanope, Philomela, Polyerate ("Well-beloved"), Rodo ("Rose"), Sime ("Snub-nose"), Terpsikome, Thaleia, Tragoedia ("Tragedy") and Xantho ("Fair-hair").

== List of maenads in Dionysiaca ==
Eighteen maenads are named in Dionysiaca of Nonnus of Panopolis:

Stronger than these then came the nurses of Dionysos, troops of Bassarids well skilled in their art: Aigle and Callichore, Eupetale and Ione, laughing Calyce, Bryusa companion of the Seasons, Seilene and Rhode, Ocynoe and Ereutho, Acrete and Methe, rosy Oinanthe with Harpe and silverfoot Lycaste, Stesichore and Prothoe; last of all came ready for the fray Trygie too, that grinning old gammer, heavy with wine.

— Nonnus, Dionysiaca, 14.219 ff.

== In art ==
Maenads have been depicted in art as erratic and frenzied women enveloped in a drunken rapture, as in Euripides' play The Bacchae. In Euripides' play and other art forms and works, the frenzied dances of the god are direct manifestations of euphoric possession, and these worshippers, sometimes by eating the flesh of a man or animal who has temporarily incarnated the god, come to partake of his divinity.

Depictions of maenads are often found on both red and black-figure Greek pottery, statues, and jewelry. Also, fragments of reliefs of female worshipers of Dionysus have been discovered at Corinth. Mark W. Edwards in his paper "Representation of Maenads on Archaic Red-Figure Vases" traces the evolution of maenad depictions on red figure vases. Edwards distinguishes between "nymphs", which appear earlier on Greek pottery, and "maenads", which are identified by their characteristic fawnskin or nebris and often carry snakes in their hands. However, Edwards does not consider the actions of the figures on the pottery to be a distinguishing characteristic for differentiation between maenads and nymphs. Rather, the differences or similarities in their actions are more striking when comparing black figure and red figure pottery, as opposed to maenads and nymphs.

Jean Metzinger, 1906, La danse, Bacchante, oil on canvas, 73 × 54 cm. The subject of maenads remained popular in the arts at least into the early 20th century

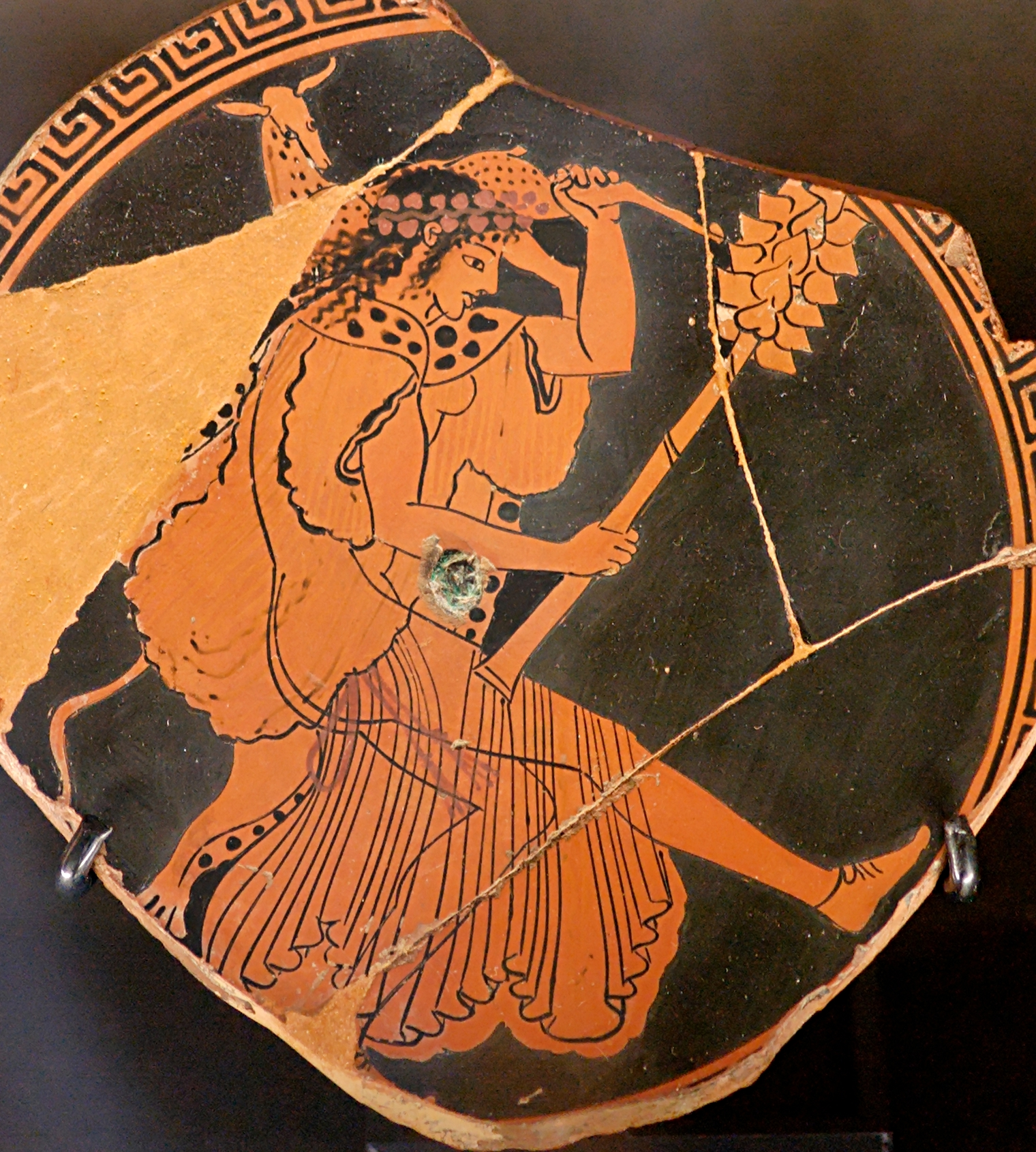
Maenad carrying a hind, fragment of an Attic red figure cup c. 480 BC, Louvre Museum.

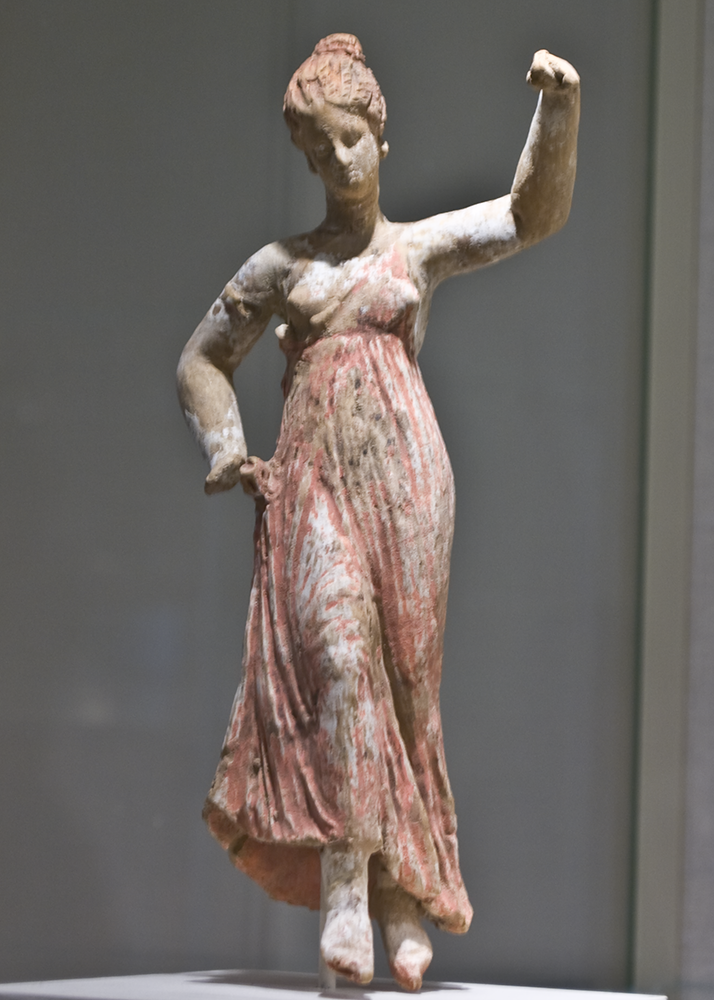
Ancient Greek terracotta statuette of a dancing maenad, 3rd century BC, from Taranto. Metropolitan Museum of Art, New York.

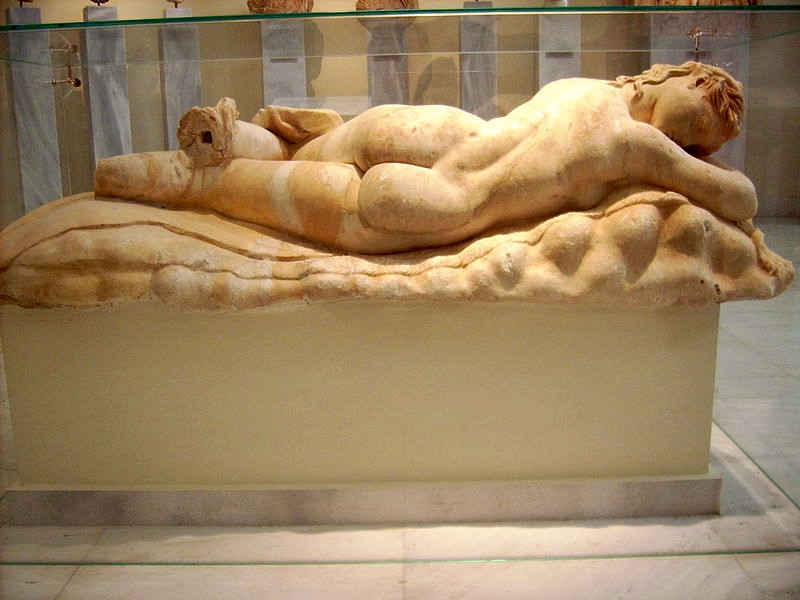
Statue of a sleeping Maenad, lying on a panther skin spread on a rocky surface; the type is known as the reclining Hermaphrodite; Pentelic marble; found at the south of the Athenian Acropolis; Hadrianic time (117–138 AD), follows a classical trend in Attic art; National Archaeological Museum, Athens.

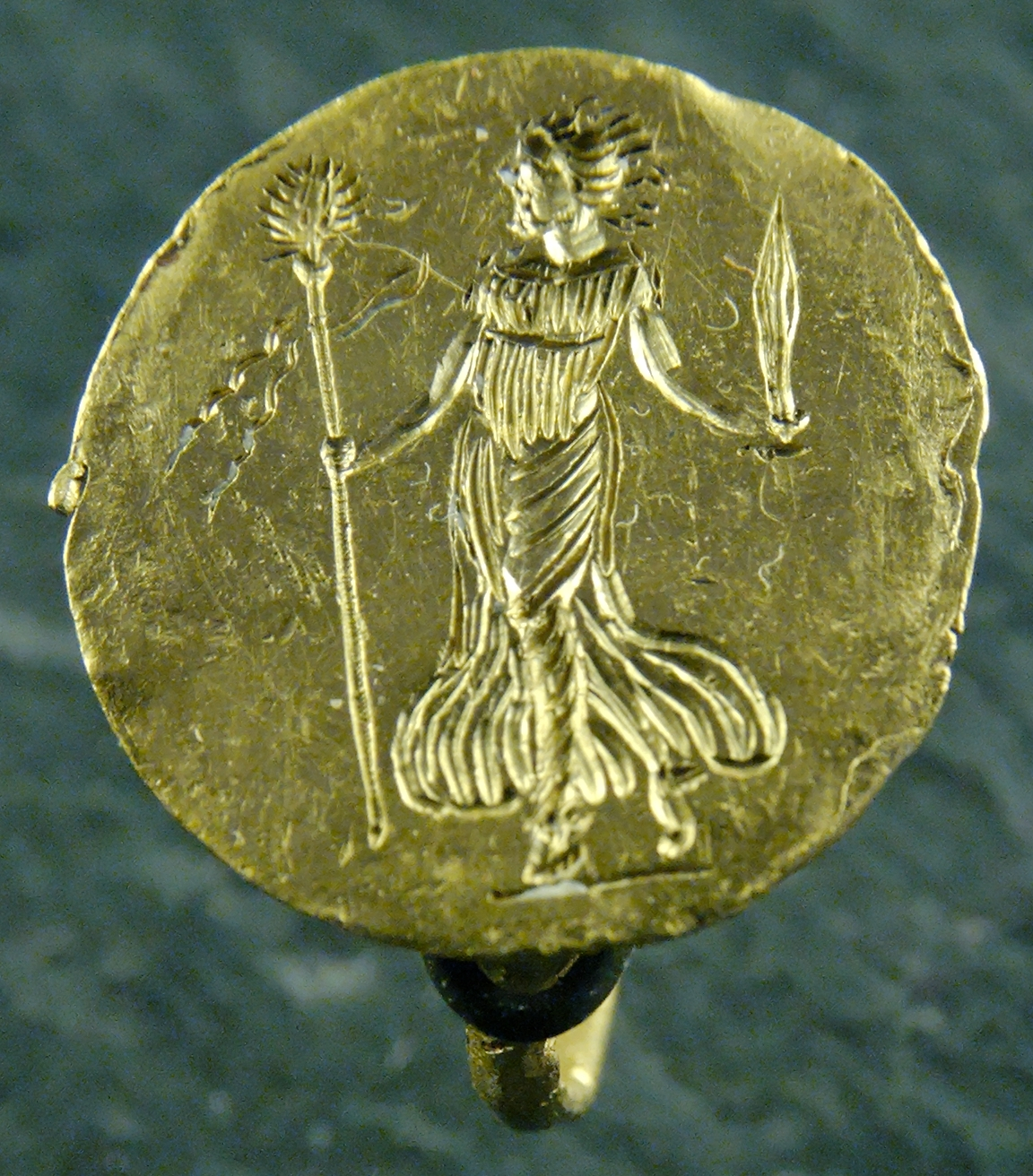
Ring with the engraved representation of a maenad. Ancient Greek artwork, 3rd–2nd century BC. Louvre, Paris.

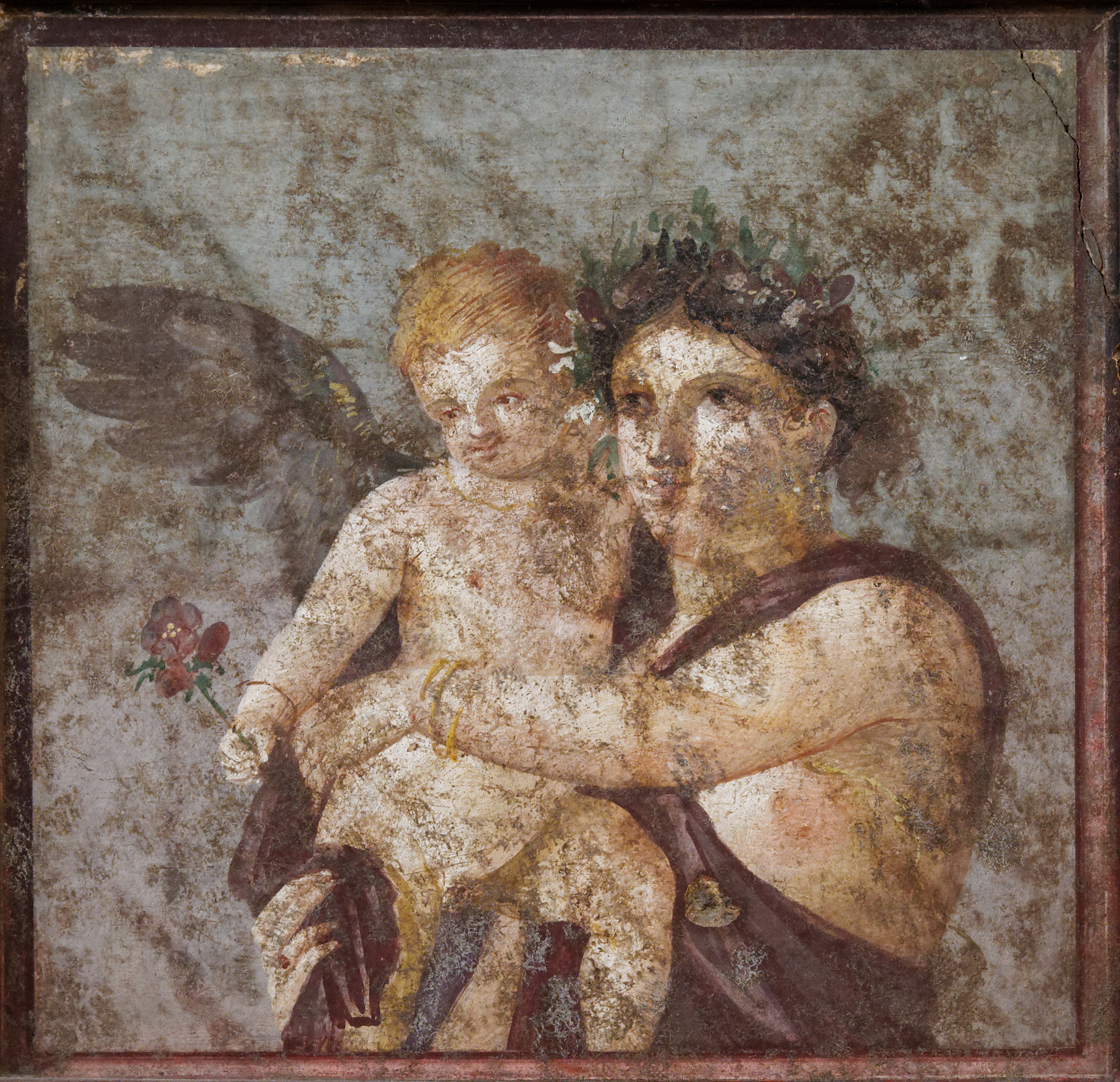
Maenad and Cupid, fresco from Pompeii, 1st century AD

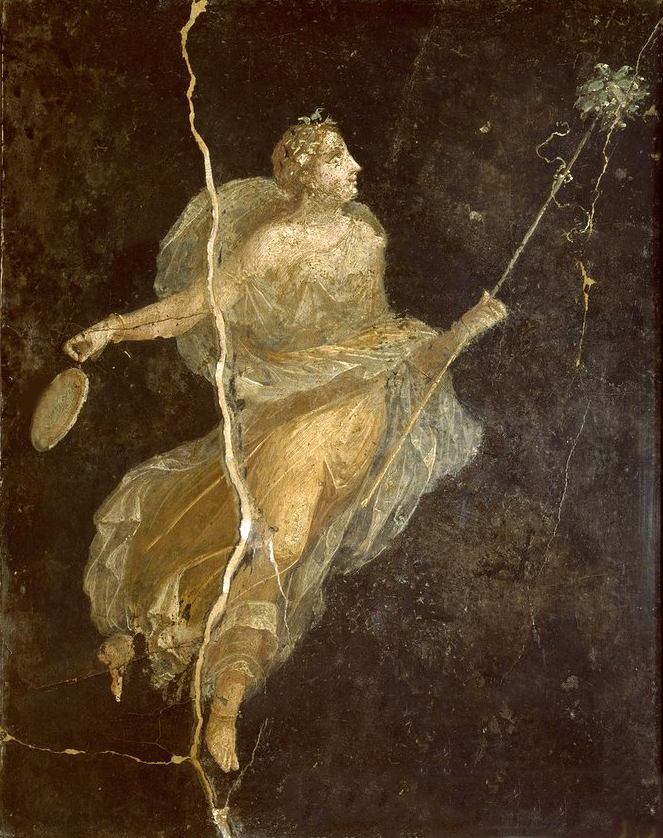
A Roman fresco from Pompeii showing a maenad in silk dress, 1st century AD

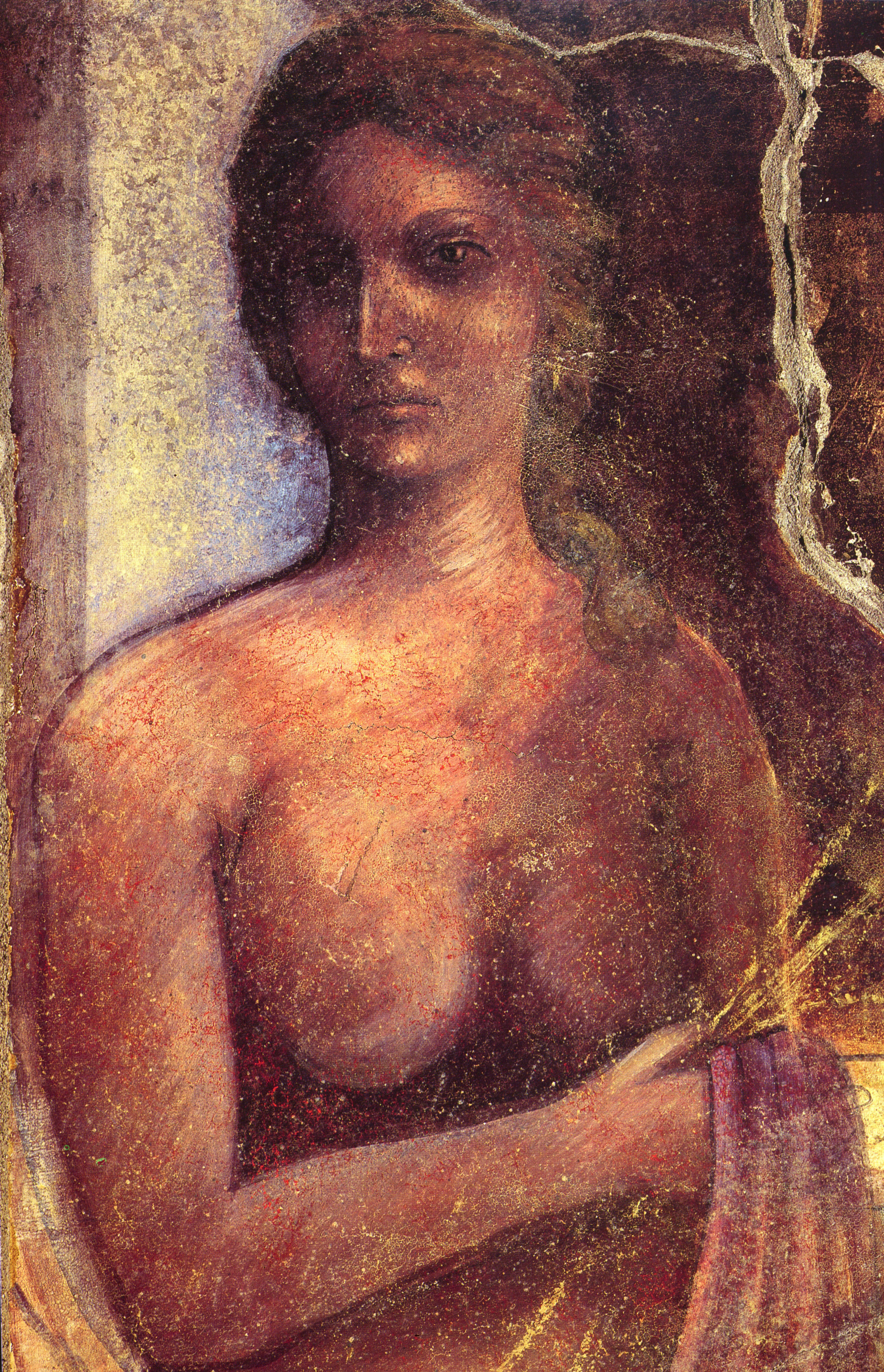
Roman fresco of a maenad from the Casa del Criptoportico in Pompeii.

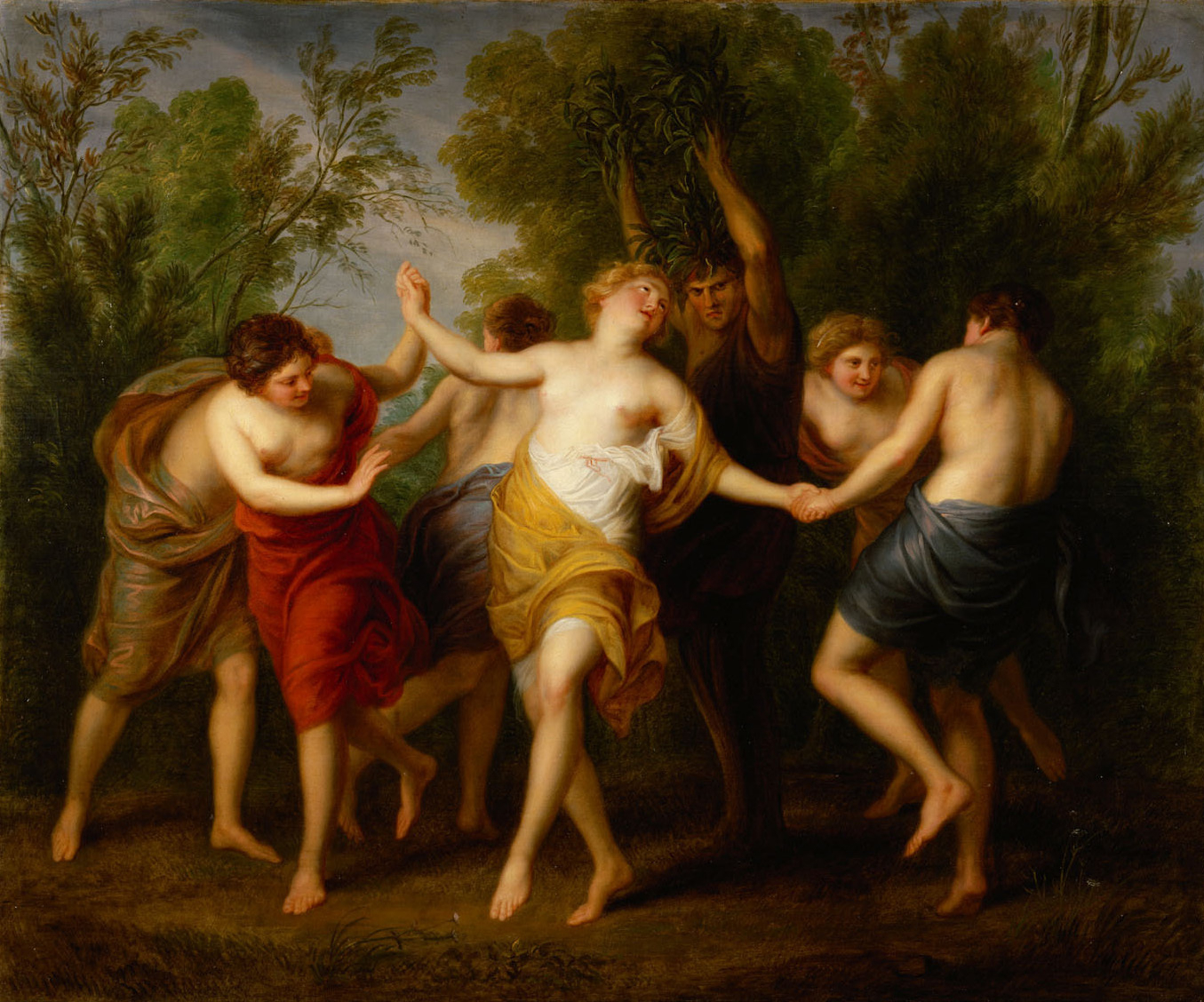
Dance of the Maenads by Andries Cornelis Lens

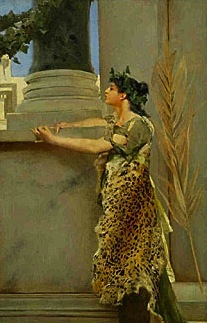
A Bacchante by John Reinhard Weguelin

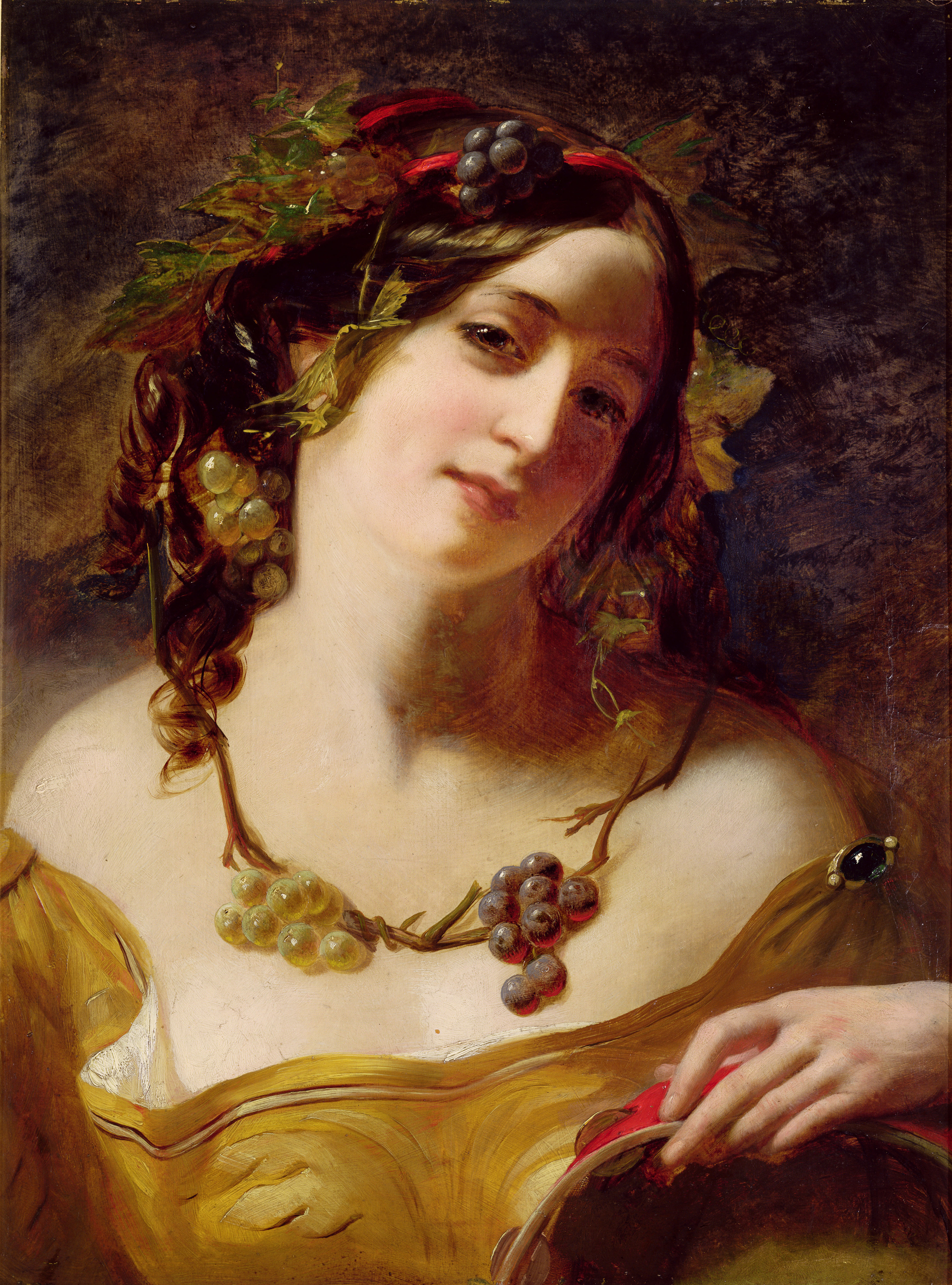
A Bacchante by William Etty

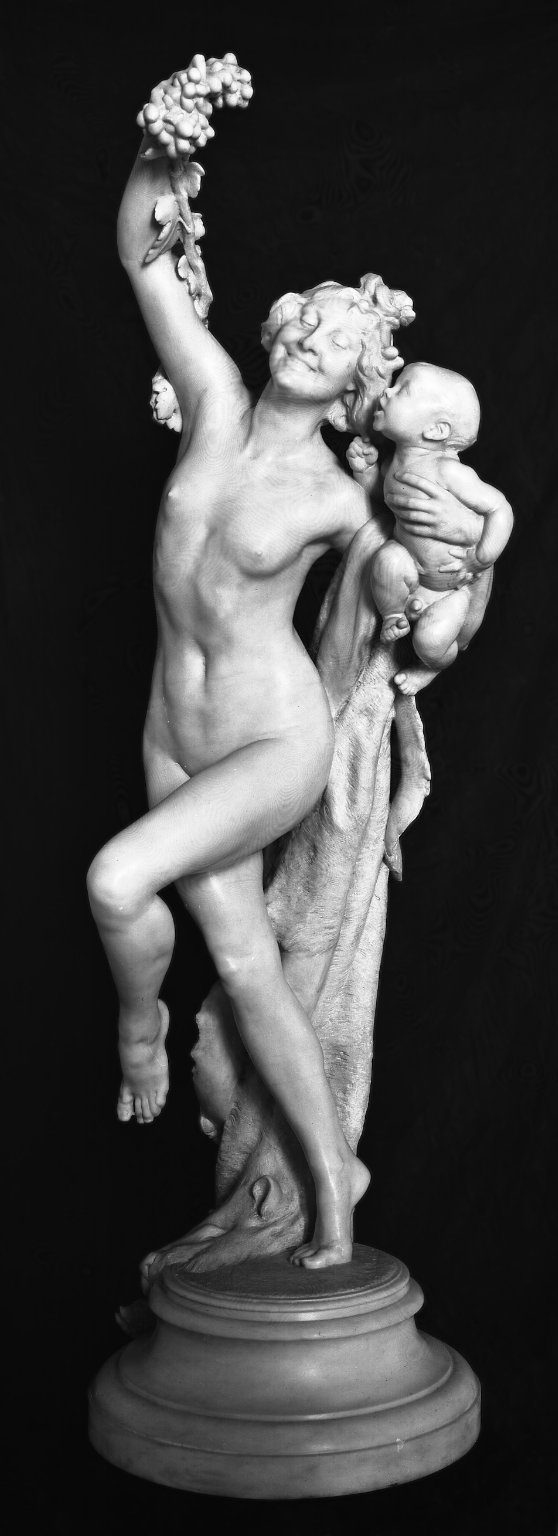
Bacchante by Frederick William MacMonnies, 1894. Brooklyn Museum

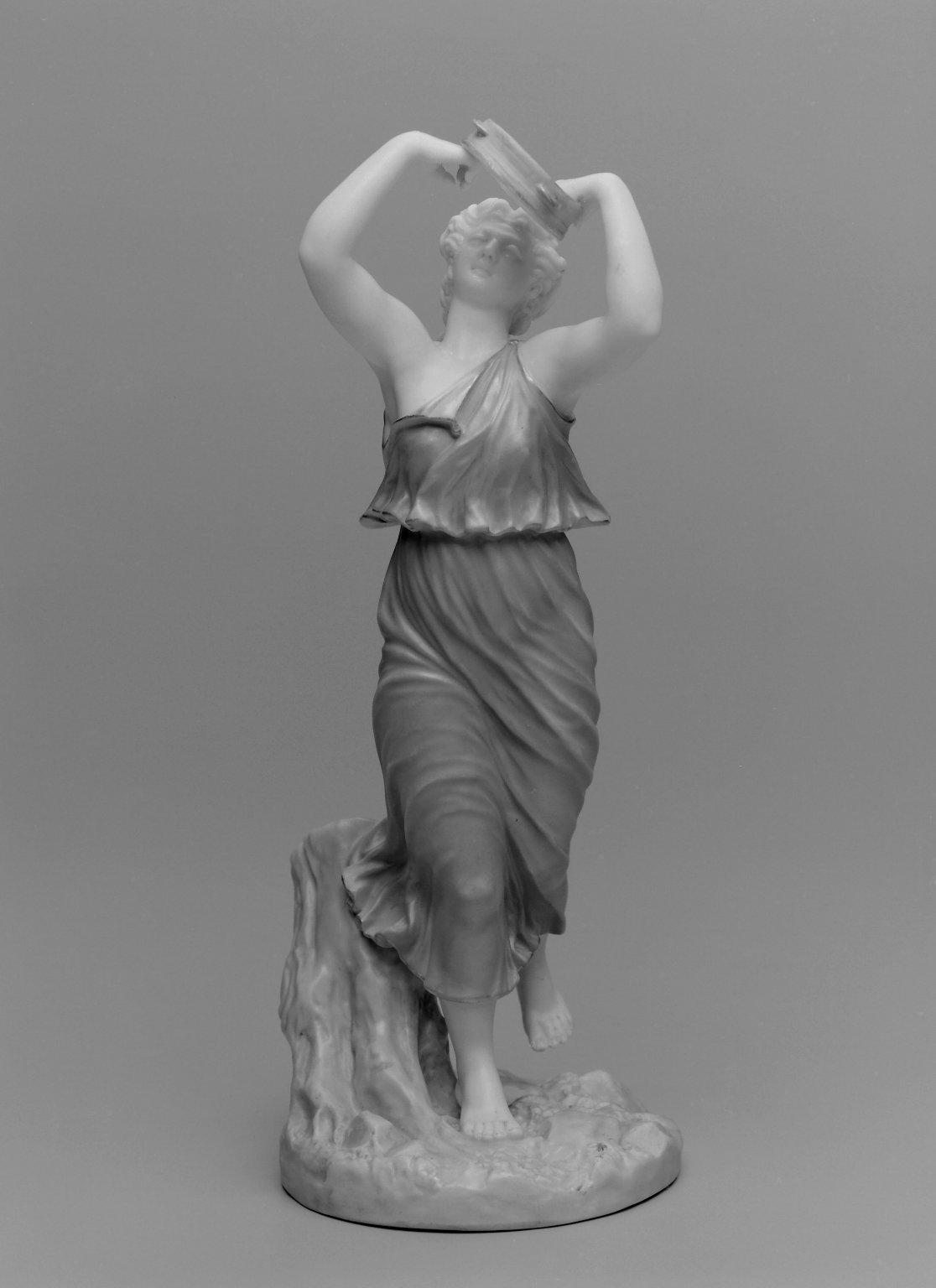
Female Bacchante by Royal Worcester, 1898. Brooklyn Museum

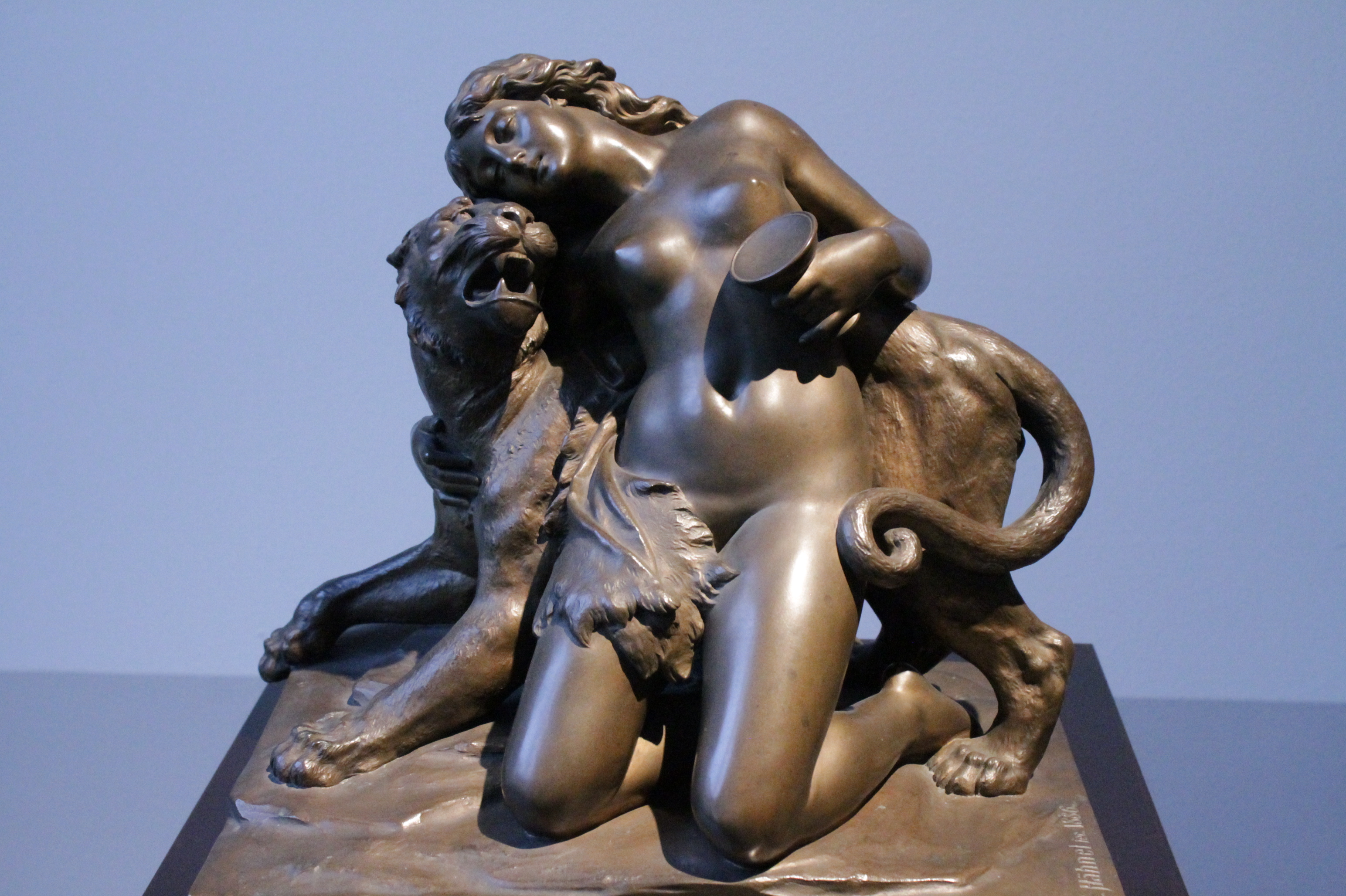
The Maenad and the Panther by Ernst Julius Hähnel, 1886. Albertinum, Dresden

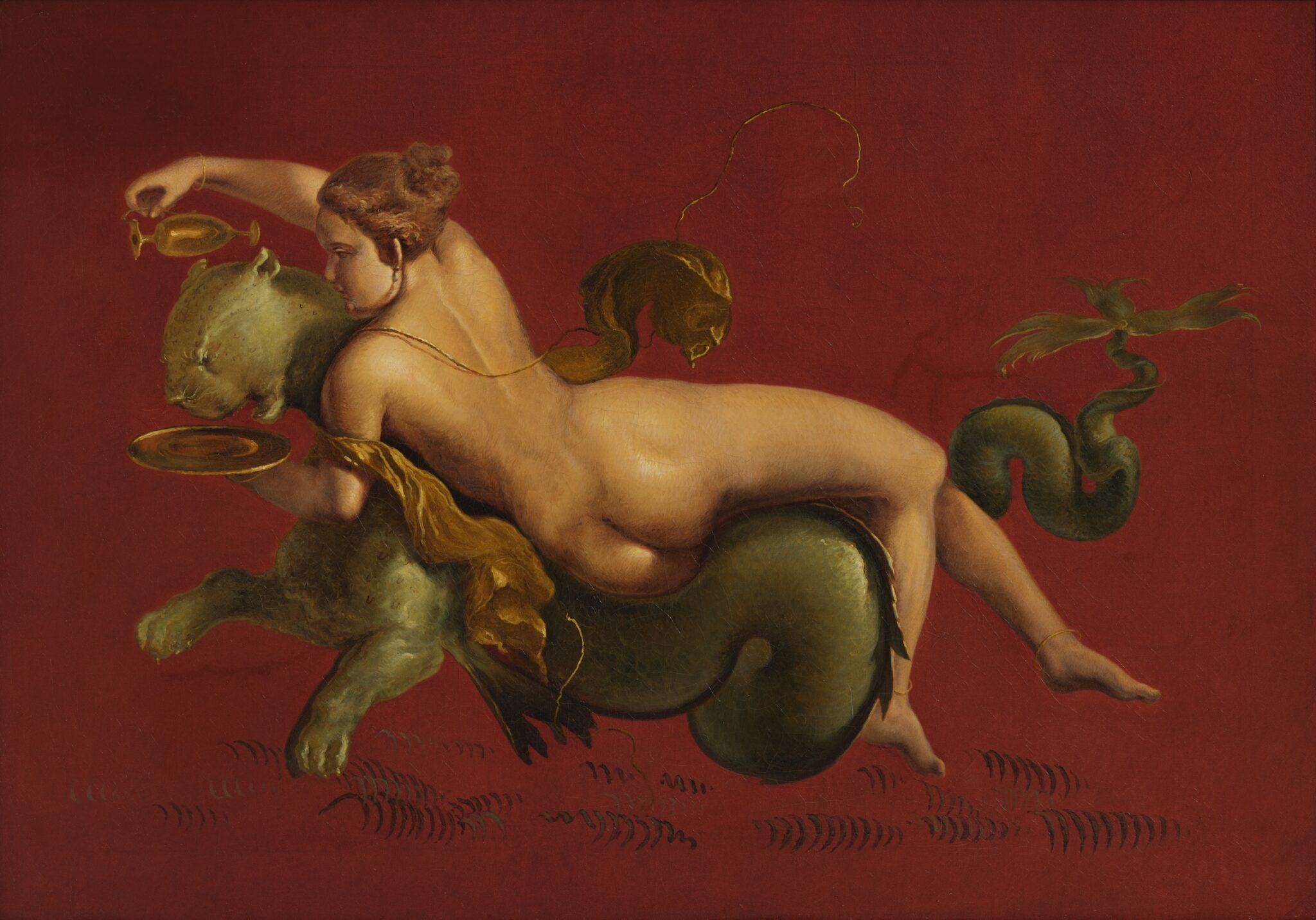
A Bacchante on a Sea Tiger (1839) by Christen Købke, based on the mural Nereide su pantera marina from Villa Arianna, Stabiae. Museo Archeologico Nazionale di Napoli.

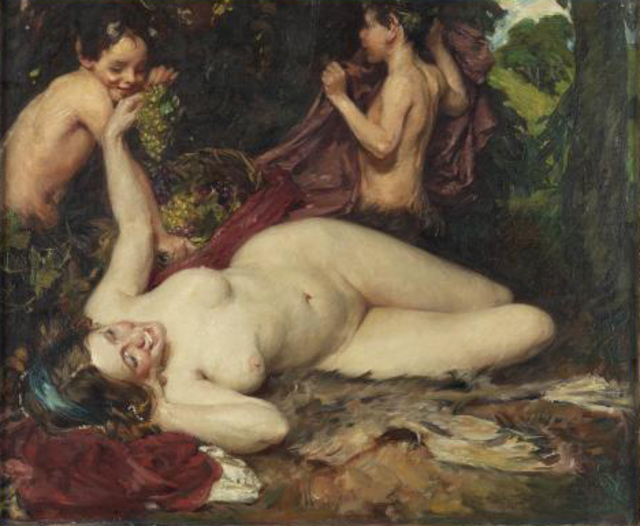
Maenad and Fauns, 1902–1912, by Isobel Lilian Gloag.

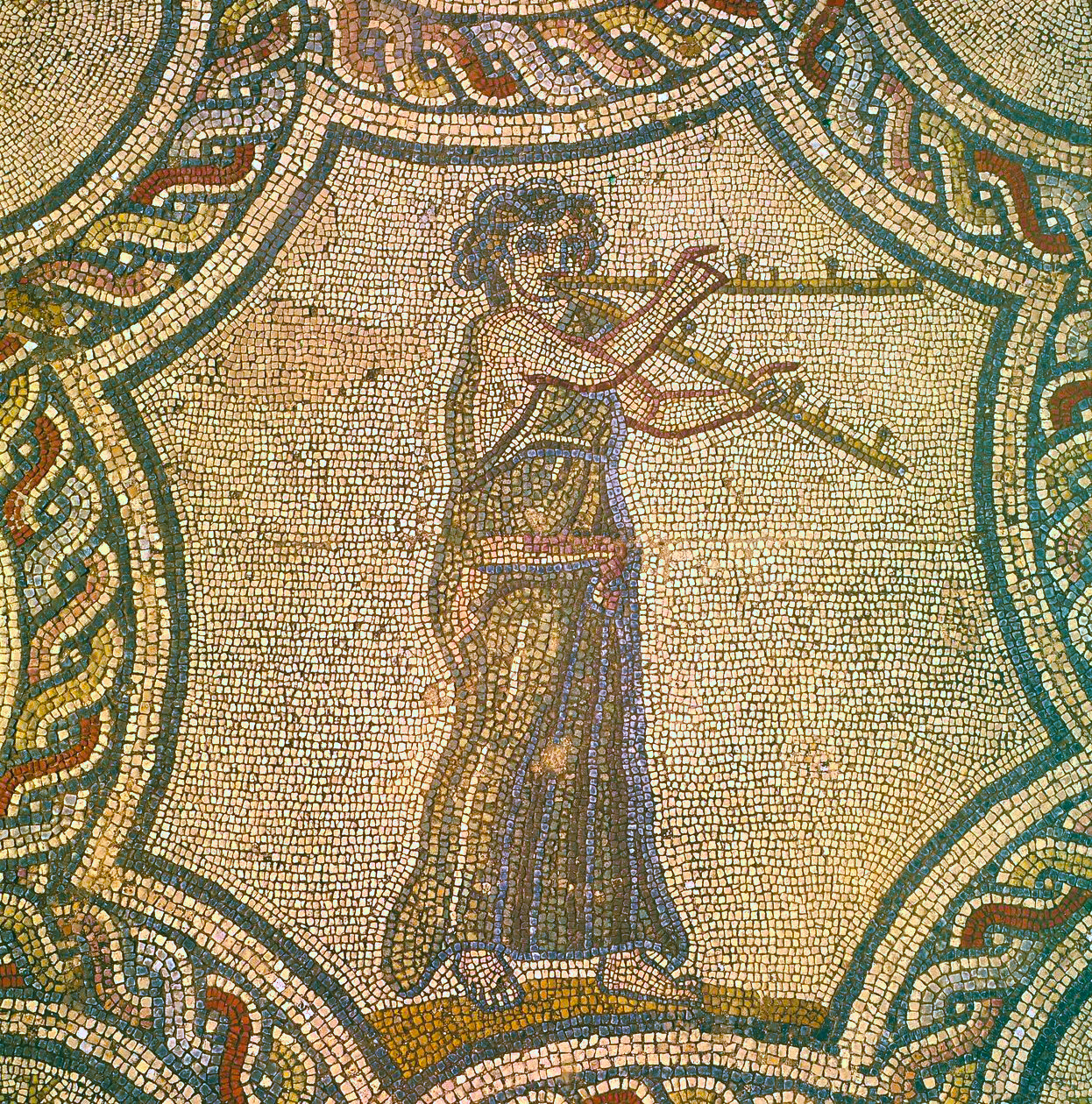
Mosaic depicting female Tibi'cina (tibia player) from House of Dionysus in Volubilis Morocco, part of the Roman Empire.

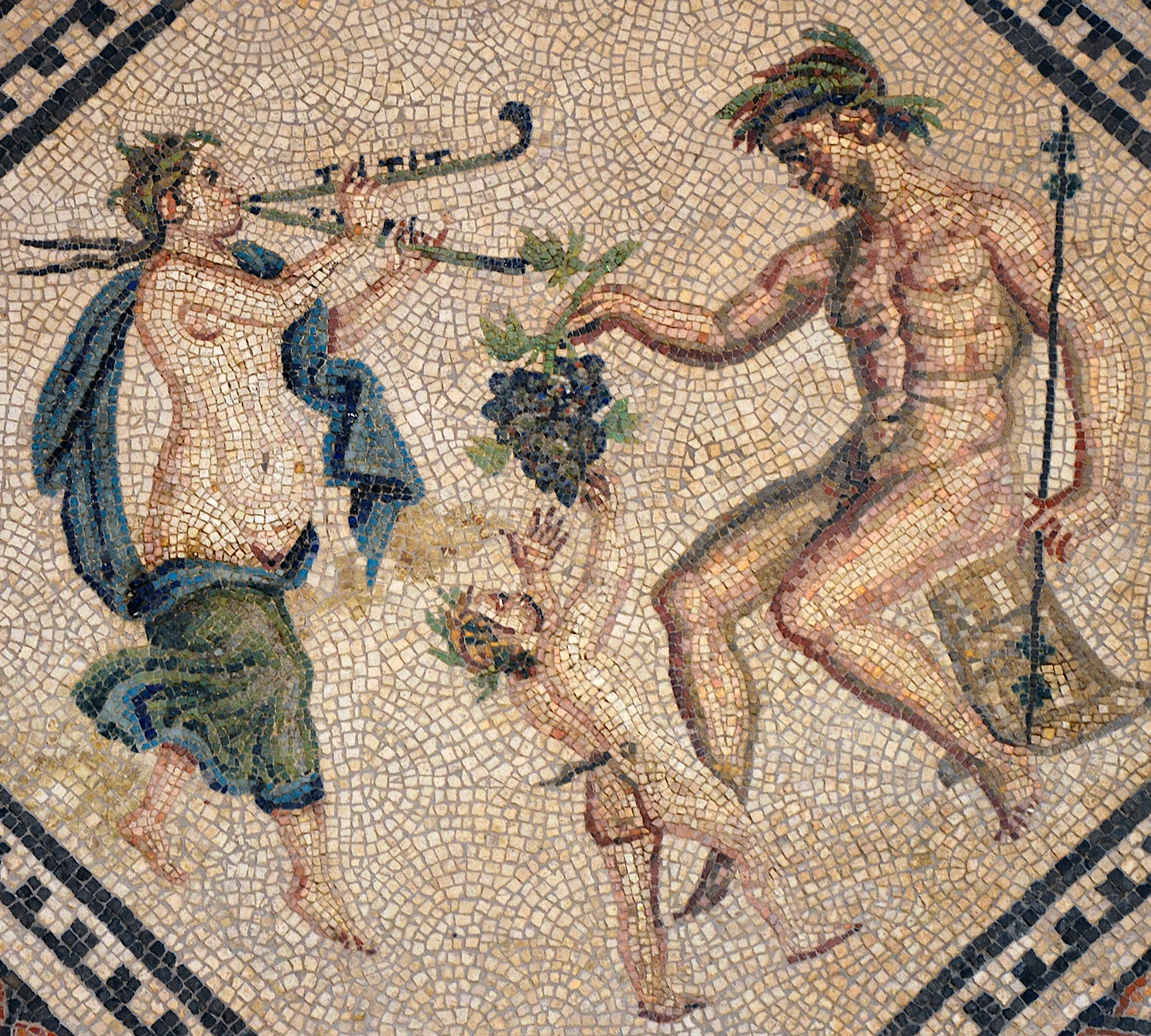
A tibia-playing maenad dancing with a satyr, part of the Dionysosmosaik, a mosaic in the Romano-Germanic Museum in Cologne, Germany.

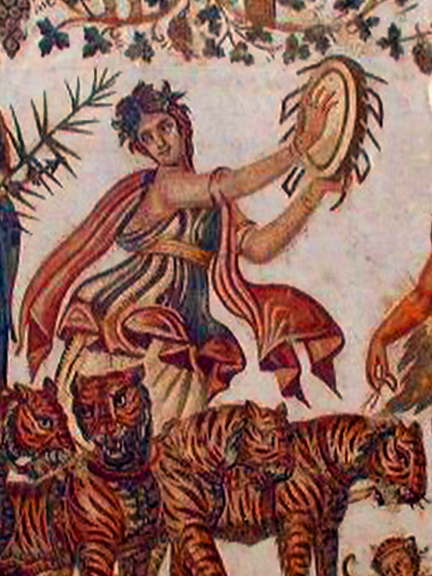
3rd century A.D., Tunisia (Roman Empire). Maenad playing a tympanum.

== References in modern culture ==
A maenad appears in Percy Bysshe Shelley's poem "Ode to the West Wind".

Maenads, along with Bacchus and Silenus, appear in C. S. Lewis' Prince Caspian. They are portrayed as wild, fierce girls who dance and perform somersaults.

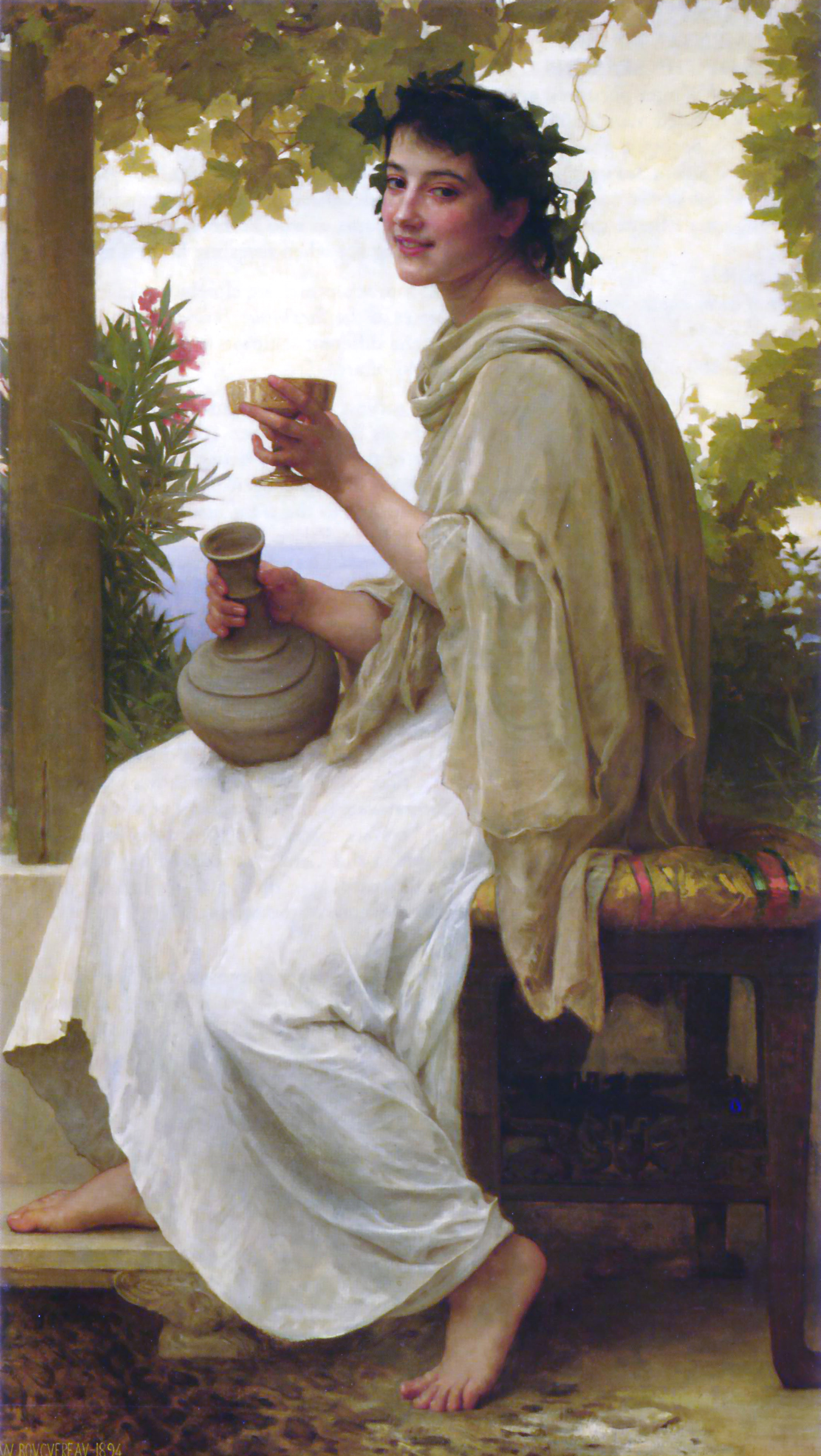
William-Adolphe Bouguereau, Bacchante, 1894.

The Bassarids (composed 1964–65, premiered 1966), to a libretto by W. H. Auden and Chester Kallman, is the most famous opera composed by Hans Werner Henze.

Maenads are the adopted symbol of Tetovo in North Macedonia, depicted prominently of the city's coat of arms. The inclusion of maenad imagery dates to 1932 when a small statuette of a maenad, dating to the 6th century BC, was found in the city. The "Tetovo Maenad" was featured on the reverse of a Macedonian 5000 denar banknote issued in 1996.

In the television series Xena: Warrior Princess and Young Hercules, the bacchae are intentionally conflated with vampires. Their presentation in the former series focuses on the vampiric aspects of this conflation, while the latter highlights their maenadic traits.

In season 2 of the HBO series True Blood, the primary antagonist was Maryann, a maenad. Many of the classic elements of maenads (including vines, people driven into a sexual frenzy and the head of a bull) were featured.

A maenad is the primary antagonist in "Last Call," a story by Jim Butcher set within the Dresden Files universe. She buys a large quantity of microbrew beer and casts a spell on it, intending to serve it at a Chicago Bulls game and drive the crowd into a Dionysian frenzy.

== See also ==
- Anthesteria
- Cult of Dionysus
- Gerarai
- Minyades
- Satyr
- Faun
- Woodwose
- Dryad
- Vila (Faery)
- Berserker
