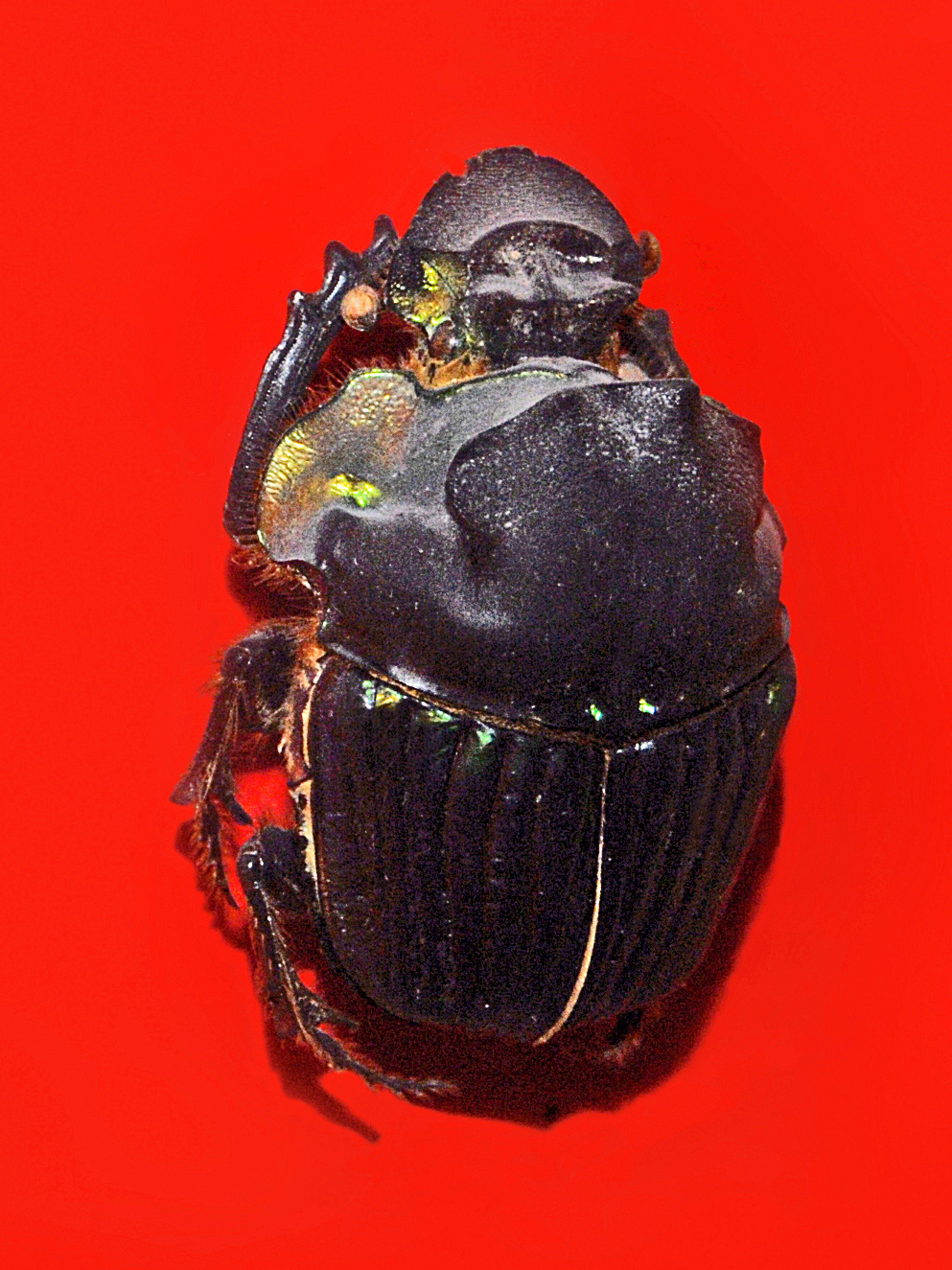
- Museum specimen of Diabroctis mimas, male

Scientific classification
- Kingdom: Animalia
- Phylum: Arthropoda
- Clade: Pancrustacea
- Class: Insecta
- Order: Coleoptera
- Suborder: Polyphaga
- Infraorder: Scarabaeiformia
- Family: Scarabaeidae
- Subfamily: Scarabaeinae
- Genus: Diabroctis; Gistel, 1857

Synonyms
- Taurocopris Olsoufieff, 192

= Diabroctis =

Genus of beetles

Diabroctis is a genus of beetles of the scarab beetle family.

Five total species are assigned to this genus.

== Species ==
- Diabroctis cadmus Harold, 1868
- Diabroctis mimas Linnaeus, 1758
- Diabroctis mirabilis Harold, 1877
