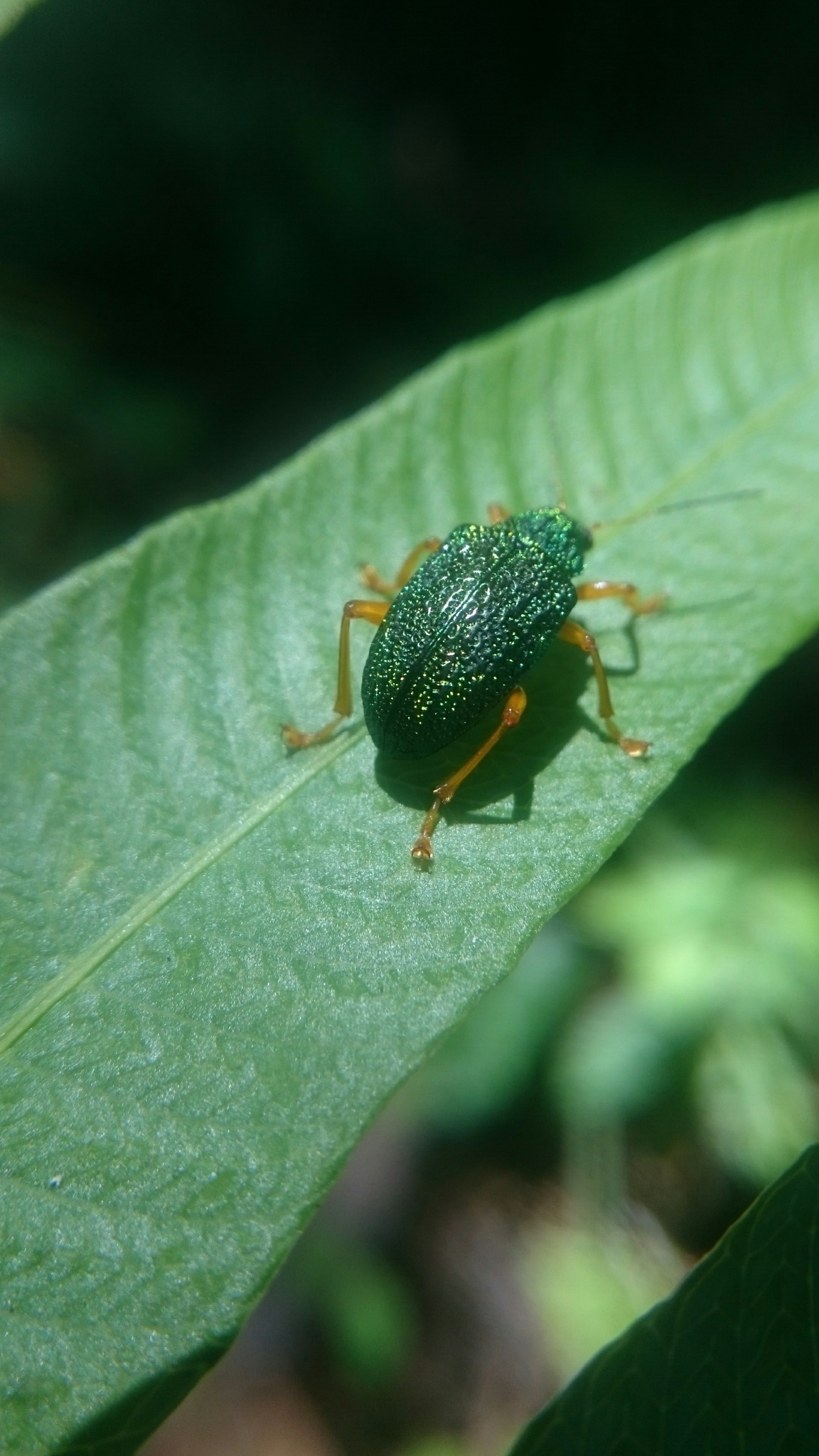
- Callicolaspis heros

Scientific classification
- Kingdom: Animalia
- Phylum: Arthropoda
- Clade: Pancrustacea
- Class: Insecta
- Order: Coleoptera
- Suborder: Polyphaga
- Infraorder: Cucujiformia
- Family: Chrysomelidae
- Subfamily: Eumolpinae
- Tribe: Eumolpini
- Genus: Callicolaspis; Bechyné, 1950

Type species
- Colaspis heros Lefèvre, 1877

= Callicolaspis =

Genus of leaf beetles from South America

Callicolaspis is a genus of leaf beetles in the subfamily Eumolpinae. It is known from South America. It was formerly considered a synonym of Lycaste Gistel, 1848, but in 2003 it was restored as a separate genus. Lycaste itself was later found to be an unnecessary replacement name for Chalcophana, and the name Eupetale was established for the species formerly placed under Lycaste.

== Species ==
As of 2003, the genus is restricted to five species:

- Callicolaspis cuneiformis Bechyné, 1950 – Peru
- Callicolaspis guignoti Bechyné, 1951 – Bolivia
- Callicolaspis heros (Lefèvre, 1877) – Ecuador, Colombia
- Callicolaspis munifica (Erichson, 1847) – Peru
- Callicolaspis ornata (Jacoby, 1903) (Synonym: Callicolaspis ellifranzaeana Bechyné, 1950) – Peru, Bolivia
