= Allocolaspis =

Scientific classification
- Kingdom: Animalia
- Phylum: Arthropoda
- Clade: Pancrustacea
- Class: Insecta
- Order: Coleoptera
- Suborder: Polyphaga
- Infraorder: Cucujiformia
- Family: Chrysomelidae
- Subfamily: Eumolpinae
- Tribe: Eumolpini
- Genus: Allocolaspis; Bechyné, 1950

Type species
- Allocolaspis halli Bechyné, 1950

Genus of leaf beetles

Allocolaspis is a genus of leaf beetles in the subfamily Eumolpinae. It is found in Central America, South America and the West Indies.

== Species ==
- Allocolaspis apatura Bechyné, 1957 – Peru
- Allocolaspis atrisuturalis (Blake, 1976) – Panama
- Allocolaspis belti (Jacoby, 1881) – Nicaragua, Panama
- Allocolaspis brunnea (Jacoby, 1900) – Brazil
- Allocolaspis cacaoi (Blake, 1973) – Costa Rica
- Allocolaspis cinctella (Lefèvre, 1884) – Brazil
- Allocolaspis confusa (Bowditch, 1921) – Brazil
- Allocolaspis costaricensis Bechyné, 1953 – Costa Rica
- Allocolaspis fastidiosa (Lefèvre, 1885) – Venezuela, Colombia, Panama
- Allocolaspis fulva (Blake, 1976) – Mexico
- Allocolaspis grandicollis (Blake, 1976) – Panama
- Allocolaspis halli Bechyné, 1950
  - Allocolaspis halli costulata Bechyné, 1997 – Venezuela
  - Allocolaspis halli halli Bechyné, 1950 – Trinidad, Guyana, Suriname, French Guiana
  - Allocolaspis halli inordinata Bechyné, 1997 – Venezuela
- Allocolaspis homoia (Blake, 1976) – Mexico
- Allocolaspis insidiosa (Lefèvre, 1877) – Venezuela, Grenada, Saint Vincent
- Allocolaspis jacobyi (Bowditch, 1921) – Peru
- Allocolaspis leiosomata (Blake, 1973) – Costa Rica
- Allocolaspis lenta (Erichson, 1848) – Guyana
- Allocolaspis mariana Bechyné, 1997 – Venezuela
- Allocolaspis medvedevi Bechyné, 1958 – Brazil
- Allocolaspis ostmarki (Blake, 1973) – Costa Rica, Panama
- Allocolaspis perplexa (Jacoby, 1900) – Venezuela
- Allocolaspis perterita Bechyné, 1958 – Brazil
- Allocolaspis sericea (Jacoby, 1900) – Colombia
- Allocolaspis spadix (Blake, 1976) – Panama
- Allocolaspis sphaerophthalma Bechyné, 1953 – Bolivia
- Allocolaspis straeleni Bechyné, 1950 – Brazil
- Allocolaspis subaenea (Jacoby, 1890) – Guatemala, Costa Rica
- Allocolaspis subcostata (Jacoby, 1881) – Panama
- Allocolaspis submetallica (Jacoby, 1881) – Belize, Guatemala, Costa Rica, Panama
- Allocolaspis taylori Bechyné, 1950
  - Allocolaspis taylori llanera Bechyné, 1997 – Venezuela
  - Allocolaspis taylori taylori Bechyné, 1950 – Trinidad, Venezuela
- Allocolaspis urucuana Bechyné, 1957 – Brazil

Synonyms:

- Allocolaspis gregalis (Weise, 1921): moved to Corysthea
- Allocolaspis rufa (Weise, 1921): moved to Corysthea
