= Corysthea =

Scientific classification
- Kingdom: Animalia
- Phylum: Arthropoda
- Clade: Pancrustacea
- Class: Insecta
- Order: Coleoptera
- Suborder: Polyphaga
- Infraorder: Cucujiformia
- Family: Chrysomelidae
- Subfamily: Eumolpinae
- Tribe: Eumolpini
- Genus: Corysthea; Baly, 1865

Type species
- Corycia funesta Baly, 1864

Synonyms
- Corycia Baly, 1864 (preoccupied)

Genus of leaf beetles from South America

Corysthea is a genus of leaf beetles in the subfamily Eumolpinae. It is distributed in South America.

== Species ==
- Corysthea admissa Bechyné, 1953 – Peru
- Corysthea boliviana Bechyné, 1951 – Bolivia
- Corysthea chalybaea Lefèvre, 1891 – Colombia
- Corysthea colasi Bechyné, 1951 – Brazil
- Corysthea cribrata Lefèvre, 1891 – Brazil
- Corysthea funesta (Baly, 1864)
  - Corysthea funesta continentalis Bechyné, 1951 – Guyana, Suriname
  - Corysthea funesta funesta (Baly, 1864) – Brazil, Trinidad
  - Corysthea funesta vogli Bechyné, 1955 – Venezuela
- Corysthea gregalis (Weise, 1921) – Brazil
- Corysthea humilis Lefèvre, 1884 – Brazil
- Corysthea impressicollis Lefèvre, 1885 – Ecuador
- Corysthea nigripennis Lefèvre, 1877 – Brazil
- Corysthea nigritarsis Lefèvre, 1888 – Brazil
- Corysthea peruviana Bechyné, 1951 – Peru
- Corysthea pohli Bechyné, 1951 – Brazil
- Corysthea rufa (Weise, 1921) – Brazil
- Corysthea ruficollis Lefèvre, 1889 – French Guiana, Peru
- Corysthea rugulosa Lefèvre, 1889 – Colombia
- Corysthea santarema Bechyné, 1951 – Brazil

Synonyms:

- Corysthea glabrata (Fabricius, 1801): moved to Chalcophana
- Corysthea subaenea (Weise, 1929): synonym of Corysthea funesta (Baly, 1864)
