= Guyanica =

Scientific classification
- Kingdom: Animalia
- Phylum: Arthropoda
- Clade: Pancrustacea
- Class: Insecta
- Order: Coleoptera
- Suborder: Polyphaga
- Infraorder: Cucujiformia
- Family: Chrysomelidae
- Subfamily: Eumolpinae
- Tribe: Eumolpini
- Genus: Guyanica; Chevrolat in Dejean, 1836

Type species
- Colaspis octoguttata Olivier, 1808

Synonyms
- Lestivina Gistel, 1848; Eriphyle Baly, 1864 (nec Stål, 1861); Eriphylina Lefèvre, 1891

Genus of leaf beetles

Guyanica is a genus of leaf beetles in the subfamily Eumolpinae. It is distributed in South America.

== Species ==
- Guyanica albomaculata (Allard, 1894) – Brazil (Amazonas)
- Guyanica balyi (Lefèvre, 1877) – French Guiana
- Guyanica bipartita (Marshall, 1865) – French Guiana
- Guyanica circumcincta (Marshall, 1865) – French Guiana
- Guyanica congrua (Weise, 1921 – Brazil (Amazonas)
- Guyanica cyanicornis (Lefèvre, 1891) – Brazil (Amazonas)
- Guyanica duodecimpunctata (Jacoby, 1897) – Peru
- Guyanica fenestrata (Jacoby, 1900) – Brazil (Amazonas)
- Guyanica limbata (Olivier, 1808) – Brazil (Amazonas), French Guiana
- Guyanica octoguttata (Olivier, 1808) – French Guiana
- Guyanica pallida (Olivier, 1808) – Brazil (Amazonas, Pará), French Guiana
- Guyanica picta (Jacoby, 1900) – Brazil (Amazonas)
- Guyanica rectilineata (Marshall, 1865) – French Guiana
- Guyanica rufovittata (Marshall, 1865) – Brazil (Amazonas)
- Guyanica sanguinea (Harold, 1874) – Brazil?
- Guyanica unimaculata (Baly, 1864) – Brazil (Amazonas)
- Guyanica unipunctata (Olivier, 1808) – French Guiana
- Guyanica vicina (Lefèvre, 1891) – Peru

Synonyms:

- Eriphylina nigritarsis Lefèvre, 1877: synonym of Guyanica pallida (Olivier, 1808)
