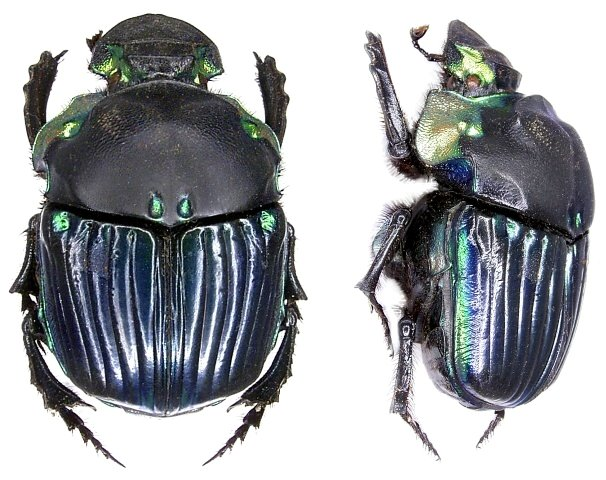

Scientific classification
- Kingdom: Animalia
- Phylum: Arthropoda
- Class: Insecta
- Order: Coleoptera
- Suborder: Polyphaga
- Infraorder: Scarabaeiformia
- Family: Scarabaeidae
- Genus: Diabroctis
- Species: D. mimas

Binomial name
- Diabroctis mimas Linnaeus, 1758

Synonyms
- Diabroctis mimas venezuelensis Martinez & Clavijo, 1990; Scarabaeus mimas Linnaeus, 1758

= Diabroctis mimas =

Species of beetle

Diabroctis mimas is a species beetles of the scarab beetle family.

== Description ==
Diabroctis mimas reaches a length of about 16–31 millimetres (0.63–1.22 in). These large beetles are black and metallic green and have a strong transverse clypeal carina on the pronotum anterior to the cephalic process. In the males the prothorax is exceptionally massive. On the elytral margins there is fringe of setae projecting from the suture. This species uses horse, cow and capybara dung and fruits as food resources.

== Distribution ==
This widespread and quite common species can be found in Mexico, French Guiana, Guyana, Suriname, Venezuela, Brazil, Paraguay, Bolivia and Peru.

== Habitat ==
Diabroctis mimas lives in grasslands, pastures, dry forests and gallery forests at an elevation of 0–1,300 metres (0–4,265 ft) above sea level.
