= Bassaris =

Fox skin worn as clothing

A bassaris (βασσαρίς) is a fox skin worn as clothing in ancient times. The Greek god Dionysus was associated with the bassaris, and his followers (the Maenads) were said to wear it. As a result, they were known as the "Bassarids." Dionysus was said to have worn the bassaris, although this detail was only to be found in Thrace.

== See also ==
- Skinning
