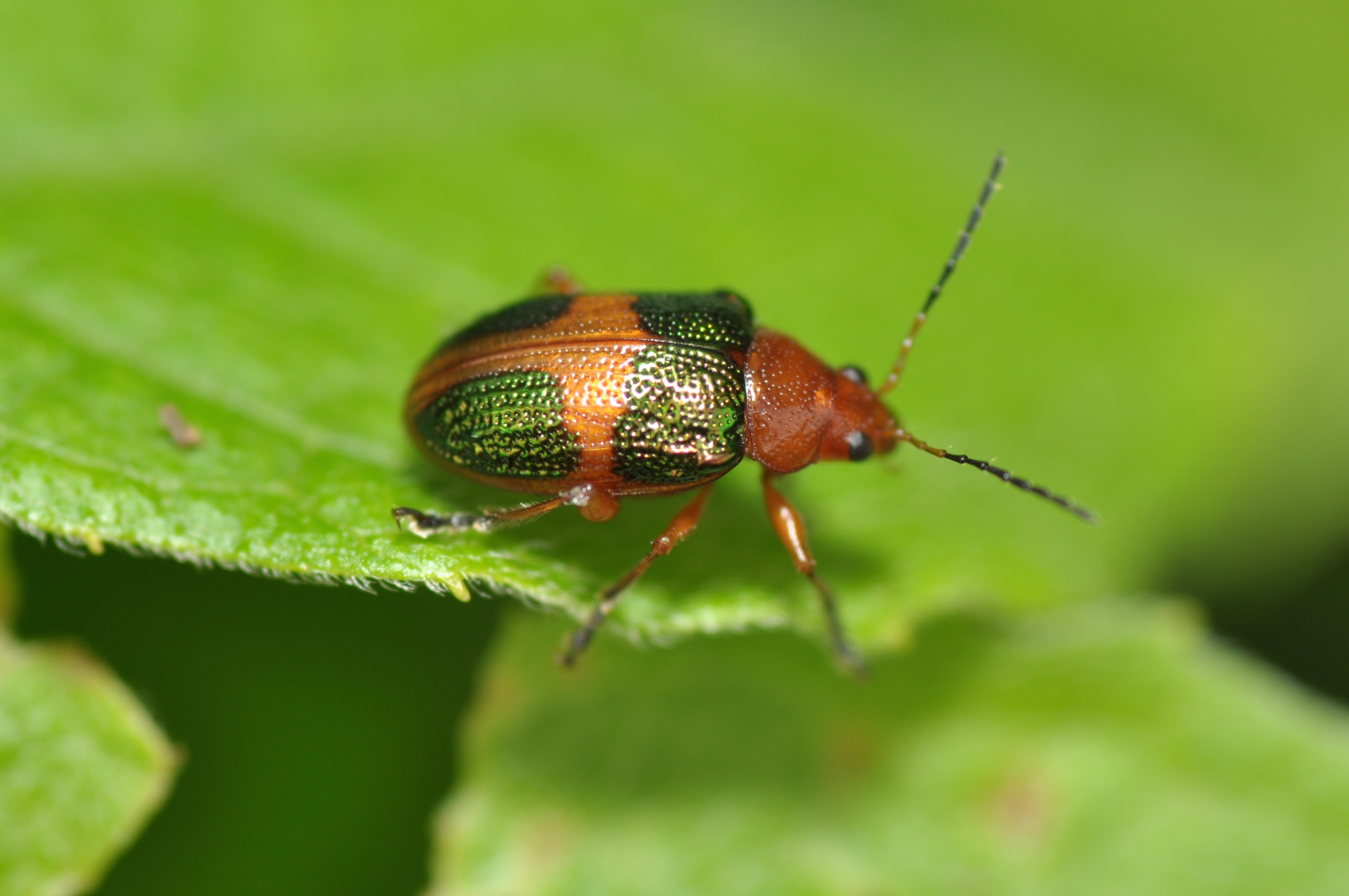
- Chalcophana sp., Mexico

Scientific classification
- Kingdom: Animalia
- Phylum: Arthropoda
- Clade: Pancrustacea
- Class: Insecta
- Order: Coleoptera
- Suborder: Polyphaga
- Infraorder: Cucujiformia
- Family: Chrysomelidae
- Subfamily: Eumolpinae
- Tribe: Eumolpini
- Genus: Chalcophana; Chevrolat in Dejean, 1836

Type species
- Colaspis hilaris Germar, 1824

Synonyms
- Lycaste Gistel, 1848 (nec Gistel, 1834); Cychrea Baly, 1864

= Chalcophana =

Genus of leaf beetles

Chalcophana is a genus of leaf beetles in the subfamily Eumolpinae. It is distributed in Central America and South America.

== Species ==
- Chalcophana abdominalis Jacoby, 1897 – Bolivia
- Chalcophana ancora Harold, 1874 – Mexico
- Chalcophana angulicollis Lefèvre, 1891 – Ecuador, Bolivia
- Chalcophana apicalis Harold, 1874 – Mexico
- Chalcophana bogotana Harold, 1874 – Colombia
- Chalcophana brevicollis Jacoby, 1890 – Mexico
- Chalcophana bryanti Bechyné, 1955 – Ecuador
- Chalcophana buckleyi Jacoby, 1880 – Ecuador, Peru, Bolivia
- Chalcophana caligans Bechyné, 1951 – Bolivia, Peru
- Chalcophana carinata Lefèvre, 1876 – Colombia
- Chalcophana championi Jacoby, 1882 – Mexico, Guatemala, Belize, Costa Rica
- Chalcophana cincta Harold, 1874 – Mexico, Guatemala, Belize, Costa Rica
- Chalcophana coerulipennis Jacoby, 1900 – Colombia
- Chalcophana colimana Bechyné, 1950 – Mexico
- Chalcophana consobrina Harold, 1874
  - Chalcophana consobrina consobrina Harold, 1874 – Brazil
  - Chalcophana consobrina limbalis Harold, 1874 – Brazil, Paraguay, Argentina
  - Chalcophana consobrina reedi Bechyné, 1955 – Brazil
- Chalcophana conspicua Lefèvre, 1891 – Peru
- Chalcophana continua Bechyné, 1949 – Brazil
- Chalcophana coronadoi Bechyné, 1947 – Panama
- Chalcophana cuneata Bechyné, 1951 – Bolivia
- Chalcophana cyanipennis Lefèvre, 1889 – Colombia
- Chalcophana densipennis Lefèvre, 1891 – Ecuador
- Chalcophana depressa Jacoby, 1882 – Mexico
- Chalcophana dilecta Harold, 1874 – Brazil
- Chalcophana dimidiata (Baly, 1860) – Brazil
- Chalcophana dimidiaticornis Jacoby, 1890 – Mexico
- Chalcophana discolor Harold, 1874 – Nicaragua, Costa Rica, Panama
- Chalcophana dissimilis Jacoby, 1882 – Guatemala
- Chalcophana divisa Jacoby, 1893
  - Chalcophana divisa divisa Jacoby, 1893 – Bolivia
  - Chalcophana divisa stöckleini Bechyné, 1950 – Colombia
- Chalcophana dominula Bechyné, 1951
  - Chalcophana dominula chanchamaya Bechyné, 1957 – Peru
  - Chalcophana dominula dominula Bechyné, 1951 – Bolivia
- Chalcophana effulgens Erichson, 1847
  - Chalcophana effulgens acutipennis Bechyné, 1951 – Bolivia
  - Chalcophana effulgens boreella Bechyné, 1953 – Colombia
  - Chalcophana effulgens effulgens Erichson, 1847 – Peru
  - Chalcophana effulgens moyabamba Bechyné, 1955 – Peru
  - Chalcophana effulgens normandia Bechyné, 1955 – Ecuador, Paraguay
- Chalcophana elongata Jacoby, 1897 – Peru, Bolivia, Argentina
- Chalcophana emarginata Jacoby, 1890 – Guatemala
- Chalcophana erichsoni Jacoby, 1900 – Peru
- Chalcophana excellens Bechyné, 1951 – Peru
- Chalcophana euxina Bechyné, 1951 – Ecuador, Peru
- Chalcophana fortepunctata Bechyné, 1951 – Bolivia
- Chalcophana fossulata Bechyné, 1951 – Ecuador
- Chalcophana freyi Bechyné, 1950 – Guatemala
- Chalcophana fulvicollis (Jacoby, 1900) – Brazil
- Chalcophana fulvocincta Jacoby, 1897 – Bolivia
- Chalcophana fuscicornis Harold, 1874 – Colombia
- Chalcophana germari Jacoby, 1882 – Mexico
- Chalcophana gigantea Lefèvre, 1875 – Brazil
- Chalcophana gigas Jacoby, 1879 – Peru
- Chalcophana glabrata (Fabricius, 1801) – Brazil, Paraguay, Uruguay, Argentina, Bolivia
- Chalcophana godmani Jacoby, 1882 – Mexico, Panama
- Chalcophana haroldi Lefèvre, 1878 – Colombia
- Chalcophana hilaris (Germar, 1824) – Brazil, Paraguay, Argentina
- Chalcophana histrio (Baly, 1864) – Brazil
- Chalcophana hondurensis Bechyné, 1953 – Honduras
- Chalcophana humeralis Lefèvre, 1882 – Ecuador
- Chalcophana hybrida Jacoby, 1882 – Guatemala
- Chalcophana illustris Erichson, 1847
  - Chalcophana illustris illustris Erichson, 1847 – Peru
  - Chalcophana illustris simplicipennis Bechyné, 1954 – Ecuador
- Chalcophana impressipennis Jacoby, 1897 – Bolivia
- Chalcophana inquilina Bechyné, 1953 – Ecuador
- Chalcophana jacobyi Baly, 1881
  - Chalcophana jacobyi binotata Baly, 1881 – Ecuador
  - Chalcophana jacobyi jacobyi Baly, 1881 – Peru
  - Chalcophana jacobyi parvinotata Bechyné, 1951 – Bolivia
- Chalcophana kirschi Lefèvre, 1882 – Bolivia, Ecuador (?)
- Chalcophana kuscheli Bechyné, 1951 – Bolivia
- Chalcophana landolti Lefèvre, 1878
  - Chalcophana landolti landolti Lefèvre, 1878 – Colombia
  - Chalcophana landolti venezuelensis Bechyné, 1997 – Venezuela
- Chalcophana latifrons Bechyné, 1950 – Argentina
- Chalcophana longicornis Jacoby, 1897 – Brazil
- Chalcophana lutulenta Harold, 1874 – Colombia
- Chalcophana melas Bechyné, 1951 – Bolivia
- Chalcophana metallica Bechyné, 1953 – Ecuador
- Chalcophana mexicana Baly, 1881 – Mexico
- Chalcophana minarum Bechyné, 1950 – Brazil, Bolivia, Peru
- Chalcophana multipunctata Jacoby, 1893 – Bolivia
- Chalcophana mutabilis Harold, 1874 – Mexico, Guatemala, Nicaragua, Costa Rica
- Chalcophana nigritarsis Jacoby, 1890 – Panama
- Chalcophana noctivaga Bechyné, 1950 – Peru
- Chalcophana nodulosa Bechyné, 1955 – Mexico
- Chalcophana oberthuri Jacoby, 1897 – Bolivia
- Chalcophana obscura Jacoby, 1882 – Mexico
- Chalcophana obversa Bechyné, 1949 – Argentina, Paraguay
- Chalcophana oedificatoria Bechyné, 1950 – Brazil
- Chalcophana opulenta Baly, 1881 – Colombia
- Chalcophana oxapampa Bechyné, 1951 – Peru
- Chalcophana palumbina Erichson, 1847 – Peru
- Chalcophana paramba Bechyné, 1955 – Ecuador
- Chalcophana parvicollis Harold, 1874
  - Chalcophana parvicollis atriuscula Bechyné, 1954 – Paraguay, Argentina, Brazil
  - Chalcophana parvicollis parvicollis Harold, 1874 – Brazil
- Chalcophana peruana Harold, 1875 – Peru
- Chalcophana porcaticolor Bechyné, 1950 – Costa Rica
- Chalcophana punctatissima Jacoby, 1897 – Ecuador
- Chalcophana puncticollis Lefèvre, 1878 – Colombia
- Chalcophana punensis Bechyné, 1955
  - Chalcophana punensis fortesculpta Bechyné, 1955 – Peru
  - Chalcophana punensis punensis Bechyné, 1955 – Peru
- Chalcophana quadricostata Jacoby, 1890 – Guatemala
- Chalcophana romani Weise, 1921 – Brazil
- Chalcophana ruficrus (Germar, 1824) – Brazil
- Chalcophana rufipennis Jacoby, 1878 – Costa Rica, Panama
- Chalcophana sabanilla Bechyné, 1955 – Colombia
- Chalcophana scapularis Lefèvre, 1884 – Ecuador
- Chalcophana schneblei Scherer, 1964 – Colombia
- Chalcophana semicostulata Bechyné, 1951 – Bolivia
- Chalcophana seminigra Harold, 1874 – Colombia, Ecuador, Peru
- Chalcophana semirufa Jacoby, 1878 – Costa Rica
- Chalcophana sericeipennis Bechyné, 1949 – Argentina
- Chalcophana sermonis Bechyné, 1951 – Bolivia
- Chalcophana servula Lefèvre, 1878 – Colombia
- Chalcophana simplex Jacoby, 1882 – Mexico, Belize, Guatemala
- Chalcophana stenocara Bechyné, 1951 – Bolivia
- Chalcophana stereomorpha Bechyné, 1951 – Peru
- Chalcophana storkani Bechyné, 1947 – Costa Rica
- Chalcophana suavis Harold, 1874 – Colombia
- Chalcophana supervisoria Bechyné, 1950 – Brazil
- Chalcophana suturalis Jacoby, 1893 – Bolivia
- Chalcophana terminalis Harold, 1874 – Mexico, Costa Rica
- Chalcophana tippmanni Bechyné, 1951 – Peru
- Chalcophana tosticornis Bechyné, 1953 – Costa Rica
- Chalcophana trinidadensis Bechyné, 1955 – Trinidad
- Chalcophana versicolor Harold, 1874
  - Chalcophana versicolor subrugosa Bechyné, 1947 – Mexico
  - Chalcophana versicolor versicolor Harold, 1874 – Colombia
- Chalcophana verticalis Bechyné, 1953 – Ecuador, Peru
- Chalcophana vilcanota Bechyné, 1955 – Peru
- Chalcophana viridibasalis Jacoby, 1897 – Bolivia
- Chalcophana viridipennis (Germar, 1824) – Brazil
- Chalcophana visoria Bechyné, 1950 – Brazil
- Chalcophana volxemi Lefèvre, 1884 – Brazil
- Chalcophana wagneri Harold, 1874 – Guatemala, Nicaragua
- Chalcophana zischkai Bechyné, 1951 – Bolivia

Synonyms:

- Chalcophana duodecipunctata Jacoby, 1897: moved to Guyanica
- Chalcophana fenestrata Jacoby, 1900: moved to Guyanica
- Chalcophana picta Jacoby, 1900: moved to Guyanica
- Chalcophana ruficollis (Fabricius, 1801): synonym of Chalcophana glabrata (Fabricius, 1801)
- Chalcophana unifasciata Jacoby, 1879: synonym of Chalcophana illustris Erichson, 1847
- Chalcophana weyrauchi Bechyné, 1949: synonym of Chalcophana buckleyi Jacoby, 1880
