= Staphylus =

Several men from Greek mythology

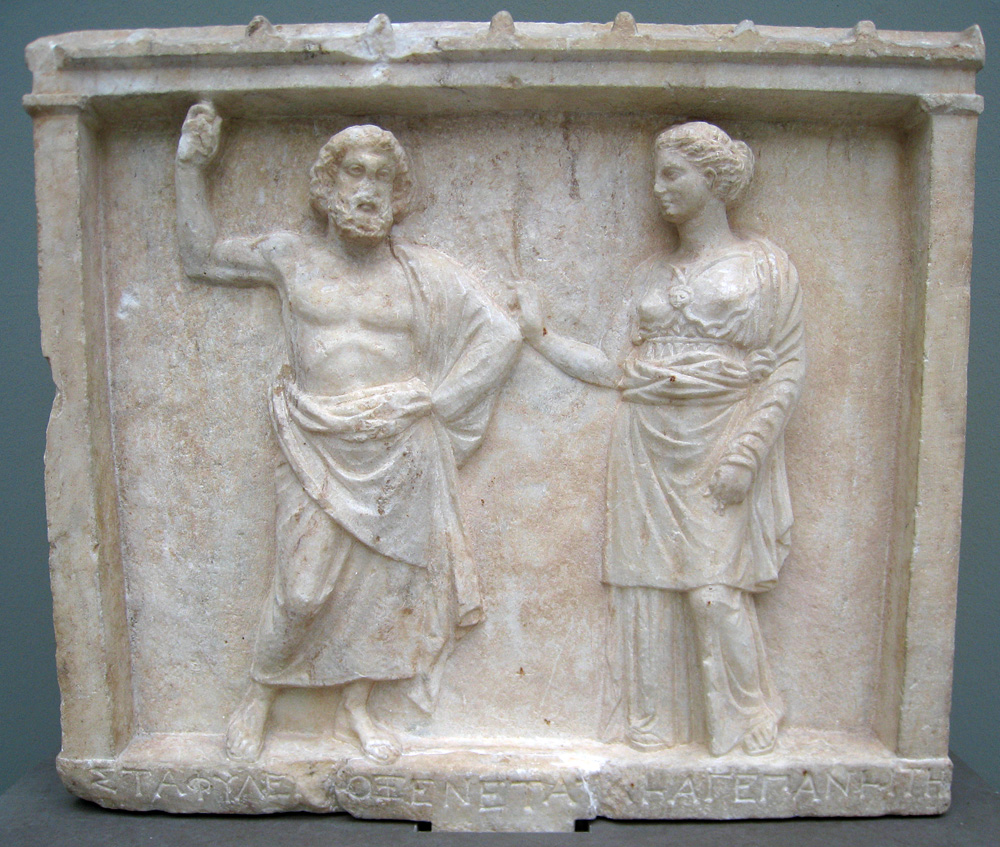
Staphylus and Athena. Marble relief, 4th century BC

Staphylus (/ˈstæfɪləs/; Ancient Greek: Στάφυλος, lit. 'grape cluster') is one of several personages of Greek mythology, almost always associated with grapes or wine:

- Staphylus, the son of the god Dionysus and Ariadne, according to the Bibliotheca, a 1st- or 2nd-century AD mythological compendium by the mythographer Apollodorus.
- Staphylus, beloved of Dionysus, from the island of Thasos. It is because of Dionysus' love for him that Thasian wine is distinguished.
- Staphylus, husband of Methe and father of Botrys. The family held court in their palace at Assyria. They received Dionysus as guest and held a banquet in his honor. Staphylus died a sudden death the next morning after the feast; to console his wife and son, Dionysus named grape bunches after Staphylus, drunkenness after Methe, and grapes after Botrys.
- Staphylus, son of Oenomaus, who fought on Dionysus' side against Poseidon in the conflict of the two gods concerning Beroe.
- Staphylus, son of Silenus, who introduced the practice of mixing wine with water.
- Staphylus, goatherd of King Oeneus, who discovered wild grapes as he was pasturing the king's goats and saw one of them chewing on the plant. He presented it to Oeneus, who in his turn invented the way of making the grapes into a drink. When Dionysus visited Oeneus, the king served him the new drink. Dionysus suggested that the drink be named oinos (wine) after Oeneus, and the grapes staphyloi after the goatherd Staphylus.

== See also ==
- Rhoeo
- Staphylococcus
