= Lycaste (mythology) =

Women in Greek mythology

In Greek mythology, the name Lycaste (Ancient Greek: Λυκάστη, romanized: Lykaste) may refer to:

- Lycaste, a Maenad in the retinue of Dionysus.
- Lycaste, a follower of Artemis.
- Lycaste of Lemnos, who slew her twin brother Cydimus the night all men on Lemnos were massacred by their women, and was glimpsed by Hypsipyle standing over his dead body overcome with remorse.
- Lycaste, mother of Eryx by Butes.
