= Methe =

Greek mythological personification of drunkenness

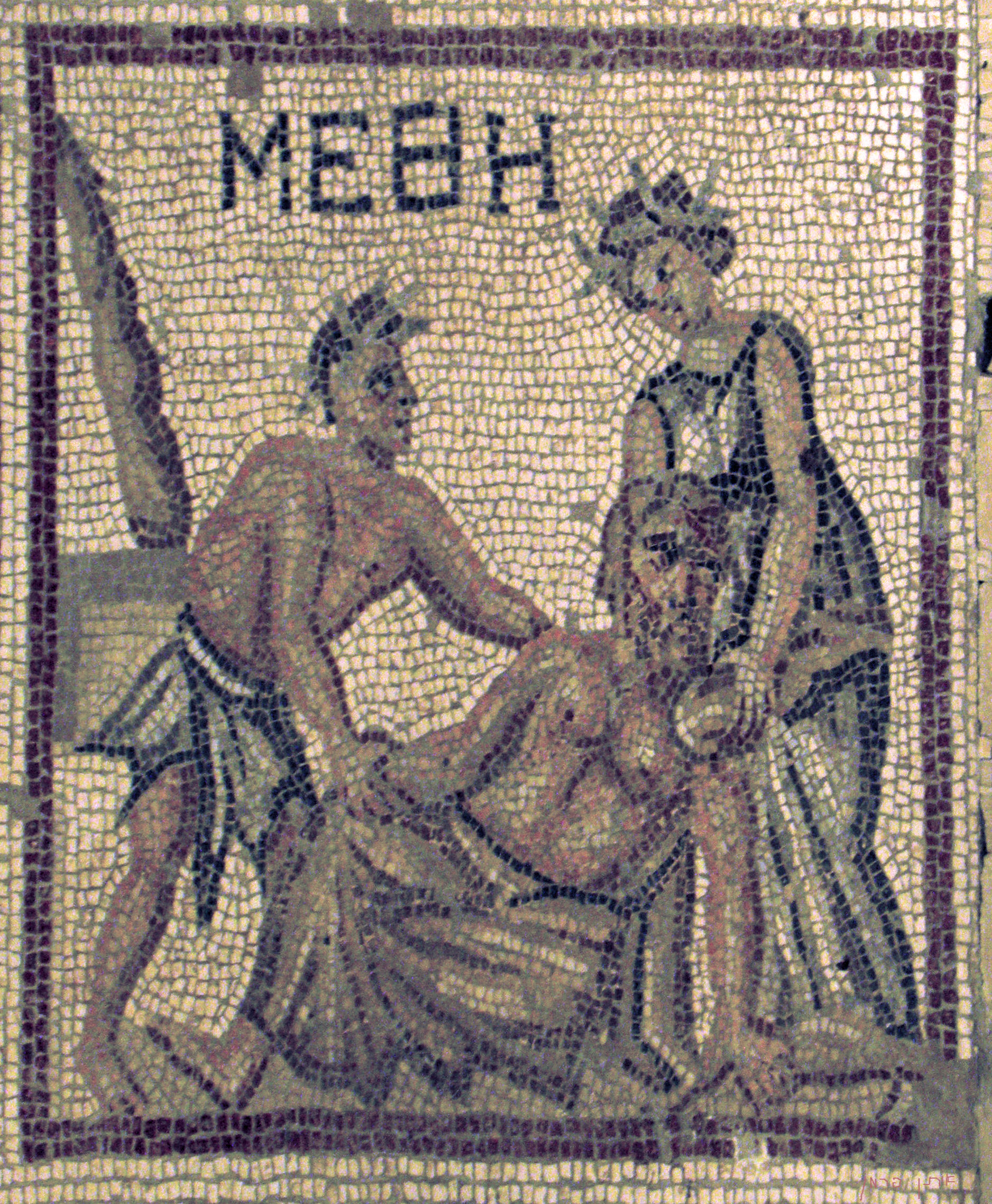
Methe from a Roman mosaic in Israel.

In Greek mythology, Methe (/ˈmiːtiː/; Ancient Greek: Μέθη, romanized: Méthē, lit. 'drunkenness') is the spirit and personification of drunkenness. She entered the retinue of Dionysus and was mentioned in association with the god or other companions of his. Methe was the daughter of Dionysus in some accounts.

== Mythology ==
The Anacreontea thus describes the mythological connections of Methe:

Let us be merry and drink wine and sing of Bacchus . . . thanks to him Methe (Drunkenness) was brought forth, the Charis (Grace) was born, Lype (Pain) takes rest and Ania (Trouble) goes to sleep.

Pausanias mentions a painting of Methe drinking wine in the temple of Asclepius at Epidaurus, and another one of her offering wine to Silenus in the temple of Silenus at Elis.

In Nonnus' Dionysiaca, Methe appears as the wife of Staphylus of Assyria and mother by him of Botrys. When Staphylus suddenly dies the next morning after a banquet in honor of Dionysus, the god makes Methe's name forever commemorated by naming the state of drunkenness after her, as well as makes Staphylus' and Botrys' names refer to grapes. Later, Methe is mentioned as one of the followers of Dionysus on his Indian campaign.

The Latin Ebrietas – female personification of drunkenness mentioned by Pliny – may be seen as an equivalent to Methe.
