= Johannes von Nepomuk Franz Xaver Gistel =

German naturalist

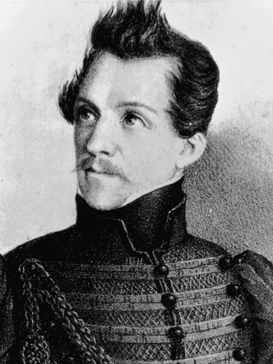
- Born: Johannes Gistel; 11 August 1809
- Died: 9 March 1873 (aged 63)

Johannes von Nepomuk Franz Xaver Gistel [Gistl] (11 August 1809 – 9 March 1873) was a German naturalist. He worked at the Museum of Natural History in Regensburg, and wrote on a range of topics, including some under the pseudonyms Garduus and G. Tilesius (the latter an anagram). His contributions to entomology include descriptions of species, with many new names he proposed now mostly relegated to synonymy.

Gistel's father Franz Xaver Gistl (1783–1815) worked at a royal riding school and died in 1813. Gistel was raised by his mother, Maria Anna Gistl (née Hahn, born 1772) and his older sister Katharina Leonora (born 1808). School records indicate that his original name was Lorenz Gistl. He was educated in schools in Rempart and Schönfeld before joining the royal gymnasium in Munich in 1822. His degrees in medicine and philosophy appear to be fake. He wrote works on entomology such as Die jetzt lebenden Entomologen, Kerffreunde und kerfsammler Europa’s und der übrigen Continente (1836) and Achthundert und zwanzig neue oder unbeschriebene wirbellose Thiere (1857), as well as species descriptions of reptiles, amphibians and molluscs.

Gistel was ignored by most of his contemporary entomologists. He has been accused of plagiarism and has been described as vain, boastful, superficial, a cheat, a liar, and a "tragi-comic figure" by Embrik Strand and Walther Horn. His isolation may have prompted him to establish his own journal, Faunus (1832–1835), where he published most of his species descriptions. He was the sole member of a society, the Münchener Verein für Naturkunde, which issued honorary diplomas in a bid to gain favours from selected entomologists. Such honorary diplomas were offered to Lorenz Oken (an erstwhile mentor of Gistel) and Maximilian Perty, with pseudonymous signatures. Gregor Mendel was said to have failed an exam to become a teacher because he made a mistake on the orders of mammals, having referred to Gistel's Naturgeschichte des Thierreichs.

Gistel lived in Munich in the family estate at Geisenbrunn. Part of his collections are in Zoologische Staatssammlung München.

== Works ==
A partial list includes:

- Gistel, J., 1831. Entomologische Fragmente. Isis, 3: 301-310.
- Gistel, J., 1834. Die Insecten-Doubletten aus der Sammlung des Grafen Rudolph von Jenison Walworth zu Regensburg, welche sowohl im Kauf als im Tausche abgegeben werden, Nro. Käfer, München, II + 35 pp.
- Gistel, J., 1839. Systema Insectorum, secundum classes, ordines, genera, species cum characteribus, synonymis, annotationibus, locis et iconibus. Tomus imus. Coleoptera. Monachii, Heft I, 1837: 16 + 64 pp. + 1 pl., Heft II, 1838: 65-113.
- Gistel, J. N. F. X. 1846, Lexikon der entomologischen Welt, der carcinologischen und arachnologischen. Adressenbuch der lebenden Entomologen und Entomophilen etc.; der Carcinologen und Arachnologen sammt ihren Schriften, dann der Naturforscher-Akademien und deren Verhandlungen, der zoologischen Ephemeriden, Bibliographien, Biographien und Real-Wörterbücher, der öffentlichen und Privat-Sammlungen der Welt, der Schriften über Sammlungs- und Aufbewahrungsweise der Gliederthiere, mit doppelten Registern und einer Aufzählung aller entomologischen, carcinologischen und arachnologischen Schriftsteller von Aristoteles an bis zur Gegenwart. Stuttgart, Schweizerbart
- Gistel, J., 1848. Naturgeschichte des Thierreichs für höhere Schulen. Stuttgart, 216 pp. + 32 pl.
- Gistel, J., 1857. Vacuna oder die Geheimnisse aus der organischen und leblosen Welt. Ungedruckte Originalien-Sammlung von grösstentheils noch lebenden und verstorbenen gelehrten aus dem gebiete sämmtlicher Naturwischenschaften, der Medizin, Literaturgeschichte, des Forst- und Jagdwesens, der Oekonomie, Geschichte, Biographie und der freien schönen Künste, herausgeg. Straubing, Band I, 4+453 pp, Band II, 1031 pp.

== Other sources ==
- Evenhuis, N. L. 1997, Litteratura taxonomica dipterorum (1758–1930). Volume 1 (A-K); Volume 2 (L-Z). Leiden, Backhuys Publishers.
- Pont, A. C. 1995, The Dipterist C. R. W. Wiedemann (1770–1840). His life, work and collections. Steenstrupia 21: 125–154.
- Scherer, G. 1992, Die Sektion Coleoptera der Zoologischen Staatssammlung München. Spixiana Suppl. 17: 61–71, 5 Abb. 65-66 (collection).
