= Poemander =

Poemander may refer to:

- Poimandres, a chapter in the Corpus Hermeticum
- Poemander (mythology), a character in Greek mythology
