= Acestor =

Acestor (Ancient Greek: Ἀκέστωρ), meaning "healer" or "saviour", was the name of several figures in Classical mythology and history:

Mythological

- Apollo Acestor, an epithet of the god Apollo in his role as healer or averter of evil.
- Acestor, son of Ephippus, son of Poemander from Tanagra in Boeotia. When his grandfather, Poemander, refused the call to join the Trojan War, the Achaeans besieged him. During the fighting, Acestor was killed by Achilles.

Historical

- Acestor, Cretan sculptor.
- Acestor Sacas, surnamed "Sacas" (Σάκας) on account of his foreign origin, was a tragic poet at Athens, and a contemporary of Aristophanes. He seems to have been either of Thracian or Mysian origin.
- Acestor, a sculptor mentioned by Pausanias as having executed a statue of Alexibius, a native of Heraea in Arcadia, who had gained a victory in the pentathlon at the Olympic Games. He was born at Knossos, or at any rate exercised his profession there for some time. He had a son named Amphion, who was also a sculptor, and had studied under Ptolichus of Corcyra; so that Acestor must have been a contemporary of the latter, who flourished around Olympiad 82 (452 BC).
