= Chaeresilaus =

In Greek mythology, Chaeresilaus (Ancient Greek: Χαιρησίλαος) is solely known for having been the son of Iasius (Iasion), himself son of Eleuther. He was the brother of Astreis and the father of Poemander by Stratonice.
