= Poemander (mythology) =

Greek mythology

In Greek mythology, Poemander (Ancient Greek: Ποίμανδρος, romanized: Poímandros) was the son of Chaeresilaus (son of Iasius) and Stratonice. He was also the founder of Tanagra, which he named after the naiad Tanagra, his wife and the daughter of either Aeolus or Asopus. They had two sons, Leucippus and Ephippus, the father of Acestor. Because Tanagra was founded by him, it was called Poemandria.

According to Rhianus, Stratonice was actually the wife of Poemander, with whom they had five children: Anchippus, Ephippus, Leucippus, Rhexipyle, and Archeptoleme.

== Mythology ==
Poemander was besieged by the Achaeans in a place called Stephon, for having refused to support them in the Trojan War. At night, he managed to escape and began to fortify Poemandria. His fortifications, however, were made fun of by the architect Polycritus, who leaped over the ditch in derision. Poemander, outraged, threw a stone at him, but missed and hit his own son Leucippus instead, who died of the injury. For the murder, in accordance with the law, Poemander had to leave Boeotia, which was not easy for him, since the land of Tanagra had been invaded by the Achaeans; moreover, his mother Stratonice was carried off by Achilles, who also killed his grandson Acestor. But Ephippus, sent by Poemander to beg for aid, brought Achilles, Tlepolemus and Peneleos to his father; they escorted Poemander to Elephenor, who cleansed him for the murder of Leucippus.

In an alternate account, the son slain by Poemander was Ephippus. Ephippus was slain in a similar manner as Toxeus, who had been warned by his father Oeneus not to jump the ditch around their besieged city.
