= Leucippus (mythology) =

Name of multiple Greek mythological figures

In Greek mythology, Leucippus (Ancient Greek: Λεύκιππος, romanized: Leúkippos, lit. 'white horse') is a name attributed to multiple characters:

- Leucippus (son of Perieres), a Messenian prince and father of the Phoebe, Hilaera and Arsinoe.
- Leucippus of Crete, son of Lamprus and Galatea, who was born female and was magically transformed into a man by the goddess Leto.
- Leucippus, the son of Thurimachus and king of Sicyon.
- Leucippus, the son of Xanthius who consorted with his own sister and later with Leucophryne.
- Leucippus, the Thespian son of Heracles and Eurytele, daughter of King Thespius of Thespiae. Leucippus and his 49 half-brothers were born of Thespius' daughters who were impregnated by Heracles in one night, for a week or in the course of 50 days while hunting for the Cithaeronian lion. Later on, the hero sent a message to Thespius to keep seven of these sons and send three of them in Thebes while the remaining forty, joined by Iolaus, were dispatched to the island of Sardinia to found a colony.
- Leucippus, a Calydonian hunter, son of Hippocoon.
- Leucippus, a Pisatian prince as son of King Oenomaus. He was a companion of Daphne, whom he was in love with and tried to approach in the disguise of a fellow nymph of hers. Because of Apollo's jealousy, his disguise was revealed by the nymphs, who killed him instantly upon discovery. This Leucippus might be the one referred to having a wife and a rival Apollo in love.
- Leucippus, the son of Poemander and Tanagra. Poemander had refused the Achaeans' call to join the Trojan War, and as a result was attacked by them. As Poemander was fortifying his stronghold at Poemandria, a builder named Polycrithus mocked him. Poemander threw a stone at Polycrithus, but missed and hit his son Leucippus instead. As a result, Poemander was banished and later purified of the murder by Elephenor. Leucippus' wife was named Graia, daughter of Medeon.
- Leucippus, a Lesbian prince and one of the sons of King Macareus, and the leader of a colony at Rhodes
- Leucippus, son of Naxos, the eponym of Naxos, and king of the island. His son was Smerdius.
- Leucippus, a Cyrenean prince as son of King Eurypylus of Cyrene and Sterope, daughter of Helios. He was the brother of Lycaon.
