= Eurypyle =

Four figures in Greek mythology

In Greek mythology, Eurypyle (Ancient Greek: Εὐρυπύλη, lit. 'wide-gated' or 'wide gate') may refer to the following personages:

- Eurypyle, an Amazon queen.
- Eurypyle, another name for Eurycyda who bore Eleius to Poseidon.
- Eurypyle, a Thespian princess as one of the 50 daughters of King Thespius and Megamede or by one of his many wives. When Heracles hunted and ultimately slayed the Cithaeronian lion, Eurypyle with her other sisters, except for one, all laid with the hero in a night, a week or for 50 days as what their father strongly desired it to be. Eurypyle bore Heracles a son, Archedicus.
- Eurypyle, a maenad.
