= Eurybia (Greek myth) =

In Greek mythology, Eurybia (/jʊəˈrɪbiə/; Ancient Greek: Εὐρυβία or Εὐρυβίη, romanized: Eurybiê, lit. 'wide force' or 'broad sway')

- Eurybia, the goddess daughter of Pontus and Gaia, and mother by the Titan Crius of Astraeus, Pallas and Perses.
- Eurybia, one of the many daughters of Thespius and Megamede. She consorted with Heracles and had a son Polylaus.
- Eurybia, an Amazon warrior and a companion of Artemis in the hunt. She participated in the battle against Heracles during his Ninth Labor to retrieve the girdle of Queen Hippolyta.
