= Stratonice (mythology) =

Ancient Greek female name

Stratonice (Ancient Greek: Στρατoνίκη from στρατός "army" and νίκη "victory") is the name of four women in Greek mythology.

- Stratonice, a Pleuronian princess as the daughter of King Pleuron and Xanthippe. She was the sister of Agenor, Sterope and Laophonte.
- Stratonice, a Calydonian princess. The wife of Melaneus and the mother the famous archer Eurytus.
- Stratonice, daughter of Euonymos and mother of Poemander by Chaeresilaus. She was carried off by Achilles.
- Stratonice, a Thespian princess as one of the 50 daughters of King Thespius and Megamede or by one of his many wives. When Heracles hunted and ultimately slayed the Cithaeronian lion, Stratonice with her other sisters, except for one, all laid with the hero in a night, a week or for 50 days as what their father strongly desired it to be. Stratonice bore Heracles a son, Atromus.
