= Erato (mythology) =

Figures in Greek mythology

In Greek mythology, Erato (/ˈɛrətoʊ/; Ancient Greek: Ἐρατώ, romanized: Eratō, lit. 'desired', 'lovely' or 'beloved') was the name of the following individuals.

- Erato, one of the 50 Nereids, sea-nymph daughters of the 'Old Man of the Sea' Nereus and the Oceanid Doris. Her name means 'the awakener of desire'.
- Erato, one of the nine Muses, daughters of Zeus and Mnemosyne.
- Erato, one of the Nysiads, nurses of Dionysus in Mount Nysa.
- Erato, a Libyan princess, was one of the daughters of King Danaus and naiad Polyxo. Under the command of their father, along with her sisters except Hypermnestra, Erato married and murdered her husband Bromios or Eudaemon at the night of their wedding.
- Erato, the dryad wife of Arcas.
- Erato, a Thespian princess as one of the 50 daughters of King Thespius and Megamede or by one of his many wives. When Heracles hunted and ultimately slayed the Cithaeronian lion, Erato with her other sisters, except for one, all laid with the hero in a night, a week or for 50 days as what their father strongly desired it to be. Erato bore Heracles a son, Dynastes.
