= Chryseis (mythology) =

Greek mythological characters

In Greek mythology, Chryseis (/kraɪˈsiːɪs/, Ancient Greek: Χρυσηΐς, romanized: Khrysēís, pronounced [kʰrysɛːís] means 'gold') may refer to the following women:

- Chryseis, one of the 3,000 Oceanids, daughters of the Titans of the sea, Oceanus and Tethys. Chryseis was also one of the companions, along with her sisters, of Persephone when the daughter of Demeter was abducted by Hades, the god of the underworld.
- Chryseis, a Thespian princess as one of the 50 daughters of King Thespius and Megamede or by one of his many wives. When Heracles hunted and ultimately slayed the Cithaeronian lion, Chryseis with her other sisters, except for one, all laid with the hero in a night, a week or for 50 days as what their father strongly desired it to be. Chryseis bore Heracles a son, Onesippus.
- Chryseis, also called Astynome, a Trojan woman and daughter of Chryses.
- Chrysis, one of the maenads named in a vase painting.

== See also ==
- Chryses (mythology)
