= Meline (mythology) =

Ancient Greek mythology character

In Greek mythology, Meline (Ancient Greek: Μηλίνη, romanized: Mēlínē, lit. 'apple-ish') is a Thespian princess as one of the 50 daughters of King Thespius and Megamede, daughter of Arneus (or by one of his many wives). She bore Laomedon to the hero Heracles.

== Mythology ==
When the Cithaeronian lion was harassing the kine of Thespius, the latter asked Herakles to kill the lion. The son of Zeus hunted it for fifty days and finally slayed the beast. The Thespian king entertained him as a guest in a brilliant fashion during that span of time, making Heracles drunk and slept unwittingly with each of his fifty daughters, including Meline. The hero having thought that his bed-fellow was always the same. Thespius intended this to happen because he strongly desired that all his daughters should have children by Heracles. In another version of the myth, the latter had an intercourse with Meline and her siblings for one week, seven laid with Heracles each night.

In some accounts, Heracles bedded in a single night with Meline and her sisters except for one, probably Anthea, who refused to have a connection with him. The hero thinking that he had been insulted, condemned her to remain a virgin all her life, serving him as his priest.
