= Laomedon (mythology) =

In Greek mythology, Laomedon (/leɪˈɒmɪdɒn/; Ancient Greek: Λαομέδων means "ruler of the people") usually refers to:

- Laomedon, a Trojan king and father of Priam, the king of Troy during the Trojan War.

Other figures in Greek mythology also named Laomedon include:

- Laomedon, also known as Lamedon, the king of Sicyon and successor of Epopeus. Laomedon gave up Antiope, Epopeus' wife, back to her uncle Lycus who had waged war against Sicyon in order to retrieve his niece.
- Laomedon, the Thespian son of Heracles and Meline, daughter of King Thespius of Thespiae. Laomedon and his 49 half-brothers were born of Thespius' daughters who were impregnated by Heracles in one night, for a week or in the course of 50 days while hunting for the Cithaeronian lion. Later on, the hero sent a message to Thespius to keep seven of these sons and send three of them in Thebes while the remaining forty, joined by Iolaus, were dispatched to the island of Sardinia to found a colony.
- Laomedon, an Ethiopian who went to Troy under the command of their leader, King Memnon, son of Tithonus and Eos. He was eventually slain by Thrasymedes, the Pylian son of Nestor during the Trojan War.
- Laomedon, one of the Suitors of Penelope. He came from Zacynthos along with other 43 wooers. Laomedon was ultimately killed by Odysseus, with the help of Eumaeus, Philoetius, and Telemachus, after returning from his 10-year journey.
