= Lycurgus (mythology) =

In Greek mythology, Lycurgus (/laɪˈkɜːrɡəs/, /lykôrɡos/; Ancient Greek: Λυκοῦργος, romanized: Lykoûrgos, lit. 'wolf-work', 'tamer of wolves', or 'defender'), also Lykurgos or Lykourgos, may refer to the following individuals:

- Lycurgus, son of Aleus, and king of Tegea in Arcadia
- Lycurgus, a king of Nemea, and son of Pheres.
- Lycurgus, king of Thrace and opponent of Dionysus.
- Lycurgus, son of Pronax, son of King Talaus of Argos, and thus, brother to Amphithea, wife of Adrastus. He was one of those who were raised from the dead by Asclepius.
- Lycurgus, the Thespian son of Heracles and Toxicrate, daughter of King Thespius of Thespiae. Lycurgus and his 49 half-brothers were born of Thespius' daughters who were impregnated by Heracles in one night, for a week or in the course of 50 days while hunting for the Cithaeronian lion. Later on, the hero sent a message to Thespius to keep seven of these sons and send three of them in Thebes while the remaining forty, joined by Iolaus, were dispatched to the island of Sardinia to found a colony.
- Lycurgus, a suitor of Princess Hippodamia of Pisa, Elis. Like other suitors, he was killed by the bride's father, King Oenomaus.
- Lycurgus, another Thracian king who was the son of Boreas. He was plotted against by his brother Butes but discovering his conspiracy sent him into exile.
- Lycurgus, alternative for Lycomedes in Homer.
- Lycurgus, the father of Antiope in some manuscripts of the Cypria, also called Lycus, who is more usually Antiope's uncle.
