= Halocrates =

Greek mythological figure

In Greek mythology, Halocrates (Ancient Greek: Ἁλοκράτης) was the Thespian son of Heracles and Olympusa, daughter of King Thespius of Thespiae.

== Mythology ==
Halocrates and his 49 half-brothers were born of Thespius' daughters who were impregnated by Heracles in one night, for a week or in the course of 50 days while hunting for the Cithaeronian lion. Later on, the hero sent a message to Thespius to keep seven of these sons and send three of them in Thebes while the remaining forty, joined by Iolaus, were dispatched to the island of Sardinia to found a colony.
