= Siproites =

Cretan hero in Greek mythology

In Greek mythology, Siproites (/sɪprˈɔɪtɪs/ sip-ROY-teez; Ancient Greek: Σιπροίτης, romanized: Siproítēs), also romanized as Siproetes or Siproeta, is the name of a minor Cretan hero, a hunter who saw the goddess Artemis naked while she was bathing and was then transformed into a woman as punishment, paralleling the story of the hunter Actaeon. Siproites' very brief story only survives in the works of Antoninus Liberalis; if any larger narrative concerning him existed, it has been lost.

== Etymology ==
The origin of Siproites' name is hard to pin down. Carnoy suggested a derivation from the word σιπαλός meaning "ugly, coarse" but this etymology is rather unlikely. Höfer meanwhile proposed that the si- syllable is a dialectal form for θεός, "god". Carnoy taking this further alternatively suggested "he who advances towards the gods".

== Mythology ==
The Cretan Siproites, while hunting, saw Artemis bathing naked; in response to the offence, the virgin goddess turned him into a woman. The myth is only narrated in a single line of a total of twelve words in the original Greek:

μεταβαλεῖν δὲ καὶ τὸν Κρῆτα Σιπροίτην,
ὅτι κυνηγετῶν λουομένην εἶδε τὴν Ἄρτεμιν.

— Antoninus Liberalis, 17
Translation:

The Cretan, Siproites, had also been turned into a woman
for having seen Artemis bathing when out hunting.

— Francis Celoria

The full story of Siproites has been lost to time; the above passage is all that remains, as Antoninus Liberalis alone preserves the tale in a brief and obscure reference, and that within the context of an altogether different myth in which a Cretan woman named Galatea lists various occasions of gods changing the sex of mortals while begging the goddess Leto to change her daughter Leucippus into a boy, fearing her husband Lamprus's (who had been told that their child was a son) reaction should he find out the truth.

== Symbolism ==
This sex-change tale shares some similarities with the myth of the goddess Athena blinding a man named Tiresias for seeing her naked, as well as the story of Actaeon, who saw Artemis naked and was transformed into a stag that was hunted down and devoured by his own hunting dogs; it has been noted that in comparison to Actaeon, Artemis was rather lenient toward Siproites for what was the same offence. The sex-reversal story brings its hero Siproites into line with several other male hunters and soldiers who were emasculated by a goddess, both literally and metaphorically, such as Attis and Orion.

In Greek mythology, female-to-male transformation is treated as a positive outcome and a solution to a problem, whereas the opposite situation where a man is transformed into a woman (which is the case for Siproites and Tiresias) is presented as a negative experience, synonymous with distress and punishment. While the scholar analyzing this pattern characterizes male-to-female transformations as punishments, Antoninus Liberalis's surviving text does not explicitly specify whether Siprotes's transformation was a blessing or a curse.

== In popular culture ==
In the 2014 companion novel Percy Jackson's Greek Gods by Rick Riordan, the myth is interpreted to suggest that Artemis transformed Siproites out of pity to spare his life, subsequently inviting her to join the Hunt.

== See also ==
Other people who had their sex changed by the gods include:

- Caeneus
- Leucippus
- Iphis
- Tiresias
- Calydon, who was petrified for seeing Artemis naked
