= Hippo (mythology) =

In Greek mythology, Hippo (Ancient Greek: Ἱππώ Hippô (genitive Ἵππωτος) 'horse') may refer to the following personages:

- Hippo, one of the 3,000 Oceanids, water-nymph daughters of the Titans Oceanus and his sister-spouse Tethys.
- Hippo, a Thespian princess as one of the 50 daughters of King Thespius and Megamede or by one of his many wives. When Heracles hunted and ultimately slayed the Cithaeronian lion, Hippo with her other sisters, except for one, all laid with the hero in a night, a week or for 50 days as what their father strongly desired it to be. Hippo bore Heracles a son, Capylus.
