= Lysippe =

Lysippe (/laɪˈsɪpi/; Ancient Greek: Λυσίππη Lusíppē) is the name of several different women in Greek mythology:

- Lysippe, the Amazon mother of the river god Tanais.
- Lysippe, other name for Cydippe, daughter of King Ormenus of Rhodes and wife of her uncle Cercaphus.
- Lysippe, one of the Proetids, the daughters of Proetus and Stheneboea. Along with her sisters Iphinoe and Iphianassa, she was driven mad, believing herself to be a cow. This was either because they would not receive the rites of Dionysus, or they scorned the divinity of Hera. They also lost their beauty: they were afflicted with skin diseases and their hair dropped out. They were cured by Melampus, the son of Amythaon.
- Lysippe, a Thespian princess as one of the 50 daughters of King Thespius and Megamede or by one of his many wives. When Heracles hunted and ultimately slayed the Cithaeronian lion, Lysippe with her other sisters, except for one, all laid with the hero in a night, a week or for 50 days as what their father strongly desired it to be. Lysippe bore Heracles a son, Erasippus.
- Lysippe, wife of Prolaus of Elis.
- Lysippe, possible name for the wife of Talaus.
