= Aglaia (mythology) =

Characters in Greek mythology

Aglaea (/əˈɡliːə/) or Aglaia (/əˈɡlaɪə/; Ancient Greek: Ἀγλαΐα, romanized: Aglaiê, lit. 'glory', 'splendor', 'brilliant', or 'shining one'means') is the name of several figures in Greek mythology:

- Aglaia (Grace), one of the three Charites.
- Aglaea or Ocalea, daughter of Mantineus. She married Abas and had twins: Acrisius and Proetus.
- Aglaea, mother of Melampus and Bias by Amythaon.
- Aglaea, a Thespian princess as one of the 50 daughters of King Thespius and Megamede or by one of his many wives. When Heracles hunted and ultimately slayed the Cithaeronian lion, Aglaia with her other sisters, except for one, all laid with the hero in a night, a week or for 50 days as what their father strongly desired it to be. Aglaia bore Heracles a son, Antiades.
- Aglaea, a nymph who became the mother, by King Charopus of Syme, of Nireus. The latter was second in beauty among Achaeans after Achilles.
