= Erythras =

Name in Greek mythology

Erythras (/əˈrɪθrəs/; Ancient Greek: Ἐρύθρας) was a name attributed to three men in Greek mythology.

- Erythras, son of Poseidon and Amphimedusa, daughter of Danaus.
- Erythras, son of Leucon. One of the suitors of Hippodamia, killed by Oenomaus.
- Erythras, the Thespian son of Heracles and Exole, daughter of King Thespius of Thespiae. Cleolaus and his 49 half-brothers were born of Thespius' daughters who were impregnated by Heracles in one night, for a week or in the course of 50 days while hunting for the Cithaeronian lion. Later on, the hero sent a message to Thespius to keep seven of these sons and send three of them in Thebes while the remaining forty, joined by Iolaus, were dispatched to the island of Sardinia to found a colony.
- Erythras, a Persian by birth, son of Myozaeus.
