= Lamprus =

Lamprus or Lampros (Ancient Greek: Λάμπρος "shining", "distinguished" or "munificent") may refer to:

== Ancient Greece ==
- Lamprus of Erythrae or Lamprus of Athens, fifth-century BC music teacher
- Lamprus, the father of Leucippus.

== Biology ==
- Lampros, a taxonomic synonym for the moth genus Orophia

== See also ==
- Lambros, the Modern Greek form of the name (sometimes written Lampros)
- Lambro
