= Hesychia (disambiguation) =

Hesychia or Hesykhia may refer to:

- Hesychia, the word from which Hesychasm, a tradition of prayer in Eastern Orthodox Christianity, is derived
- In Greek mythology, either the daemon personification of silence, a handmaiden of the god of sleep, Hypnos; or Hesychia (mythology), a mortal daughter of Thespius
- Synonym for Zygaena, genus of moths
