= Euryops (disambiguation) =

Euryops is a genus of plants in the family Asteraceae.

Euryops may also refer to:

- Euryops (species group), a wasp species complex in the genus Pison
- Euryops (gastropod), an unaccepted synonym of Pterotrachea
- Euryopes, son of Heracles, sometimes spelled Euryops

== See also ==
- List of Latin and Greek words commonly used in systematic names#E
