= Creon =

Creon may refer to:

== Greek history ==
- Creon, the first annual eponymous archon of Athens, 682–681 BC

== Greek mythology ==
- Creon (mythology), multiple figures in Greek mythology, including:
  - Creon (king of Corinth), father of Creusa/Glauce in Euripides' Medea
  - Creon (king of Thebes), mythological king of Thebes

== Medicine ==
- Creon, a brand name of a pancreatic enzymes medication

== Places ==
- Créon, a commune in the Gironde department in France
- Créon-d'Armagnac, a commune in the Landes department in France

== Other ==
- Creon (butterfly), a genus of insects in the family Lycaenidae
- USS Creon (ARL-11), a World War II U.S. Navy landing craft repair ship

== See also ==
- Kreon, a DC Comics character
- Kreon, a minifigure (similar to Lego minifigure) from Kre-O construction toys manufactured by Oxford, a Korean company, and marketed by Hasbro
