= Meline =

Meline may refer to:

== Places ==
- Meline, a parish in north Pembrokeshire in the Diocese of St David's

== People ==
- Jules Méline, French statesman and prime minister
- Jaime Meline or El-Producto, an American rapper, producer and entrepreneur
- Meline Daluzyan, an Armenian weightlifter

== Mythology ==
- Meline (mythology), a Thespian princess who bore Heracles a son

== See also ==
- Melinești
- Melinex
