= USS Creon =

Achelous-class landing craft repair ships

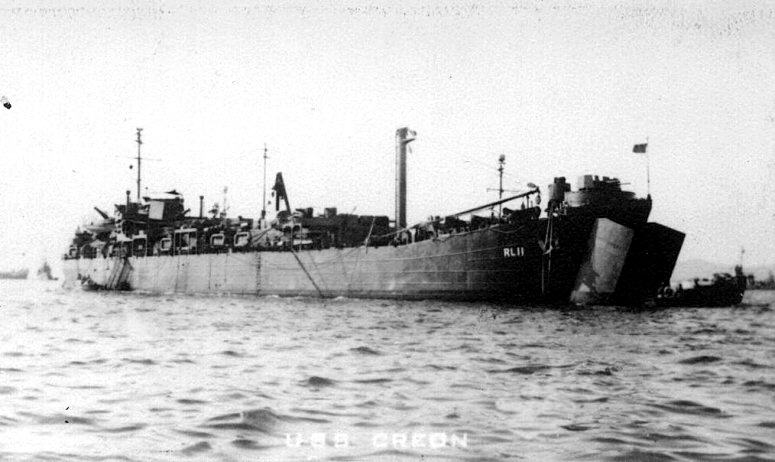
- USS Creon

History

United States
- Name: USS Creon
- Builder: Boston Navy Yard
- Launched: 24 August 1944
- Commissioned: 28 November 1944
- Decommissioned: 8 June 1949

General characteristics
- Class & type: Achelous class repair ship
- Displacement: 1,781 long tons (1,810 t) light; 3,960 long tons (4,024 t) full
- Length: 328 ft (100 m)
- Beam: 50 ft (15 m)
- Draft: 11 ft 2 in (3.40 m)
- Propulsion: 2 × General Motors 12-567 diesel engines, two shafts, twin rudders
- Speed: 12 knots (14 mph; 22 km/h)
- Complement: 255 officers and enlisted men
- Armament: 2 × quad 40 mm guns; 2 × twin 40 mm guns; 6 × twin 20 mm guns

Service record
- Operations: World War II
- Awards: 1 battle star

USS Creon (ARL-11) was one of 39 Achelous-class landing craft repair ships built for the United States Navy during World War II. Named for Creon (the name of two mythological Greek kings, a mythological son of Heracles, and a historical Archon of Athens), she was the only U.S. Naval vessel to bear the name.

Originally laid down as LST-1036 the vessel was launched on 24 August 1944 by the Boston Navy Yard; sponsored by Mrs. M. A. Pratt; placed in partial commission on 16 September 1944; sailed to Baltimore, Maryland; decommissioned on 26 September 1944 for conversion; and commissioned in full as USS Creon (ARL-11) on 27 January 1945.

== Service history ==
Clearing Norfolk, Virginia 4 March 1945 Creon arrived at Biak, Shouten Islands 4 May. Moving to Morotai the next day, she conducted amphibious training exercises, and on 1 July took part in the invasion of Balikpapan. She served off Borneo until arriving at Subic Bay 1 August to repair landing craft there until 18 December.

After loading cargo at Guam, Creon arrived at Pearl Harbor for overhaul 22 January 1946. Assigned to the service group for "Operation Crossroads," the atomic weapons tests in the Marshall Islands, Creon arrived at Kwajalein 19 March 1946 and operated there and at the test site until 10 September when she departed for overhaul at San Pedro, California. She served as a repair ship for LSMs and LSM(R)s at San Diego from 15 December 1946 until 27 September 1948.

Following an overhaul at Long Beach Naval Shipyard, Creon put out from San Diego 10 January 1949 for Kodiak, Alaska to participate in a large-scale cold-weather exercise. Creon returned to San Diego 4 March and there was placed out of commission in reserve 8 June 1949. Struck from the Naval Vessel Register (date unknown), her final fate is unknown.

Creon received one battle star for World War II service.
