= Ecdysia =

Ancient Greek ritual dedicated to Leto Phytia

Ecdysia (from Greek ἑκδύω "to undress") was a ritual involved sacred ceremonies and celebrations at Phaistos, Crete, which were held in honor of Leto Phytia, mother of Apollo and Artemis.

The legend is about the story of Galatea, daughter of Evritios and wife of Lambros. Because her husband had warned her that if she gave birth to a daughter he would kill her, Galatea, wanting to save her, was forced to conceal the child's gender and raise her as a boy, naming her Leucippus. When the young girl grew up and it was now impossible to hide her gender, Galatea desperately resorted as a supplicant to the sacred temple of Leto and asked her to transform her daughter to a son, in order to stay alive. The goddess felt sorry for her and accepted her prayers. Thus, the young girl abdicated her maiden veil and by Leto's divine intervention was transformed into a man. Thus, the feast “Ekdysia” was named after this incident.

== Sources ==
- Lampsas Giannis, Dictionary of the Ancient World (Lexiko tou Archaiou Kosmou), Vol. II, Athens, Domi Publications, 1984, p. 80.
