= Oenomaus =

Greek mythological king

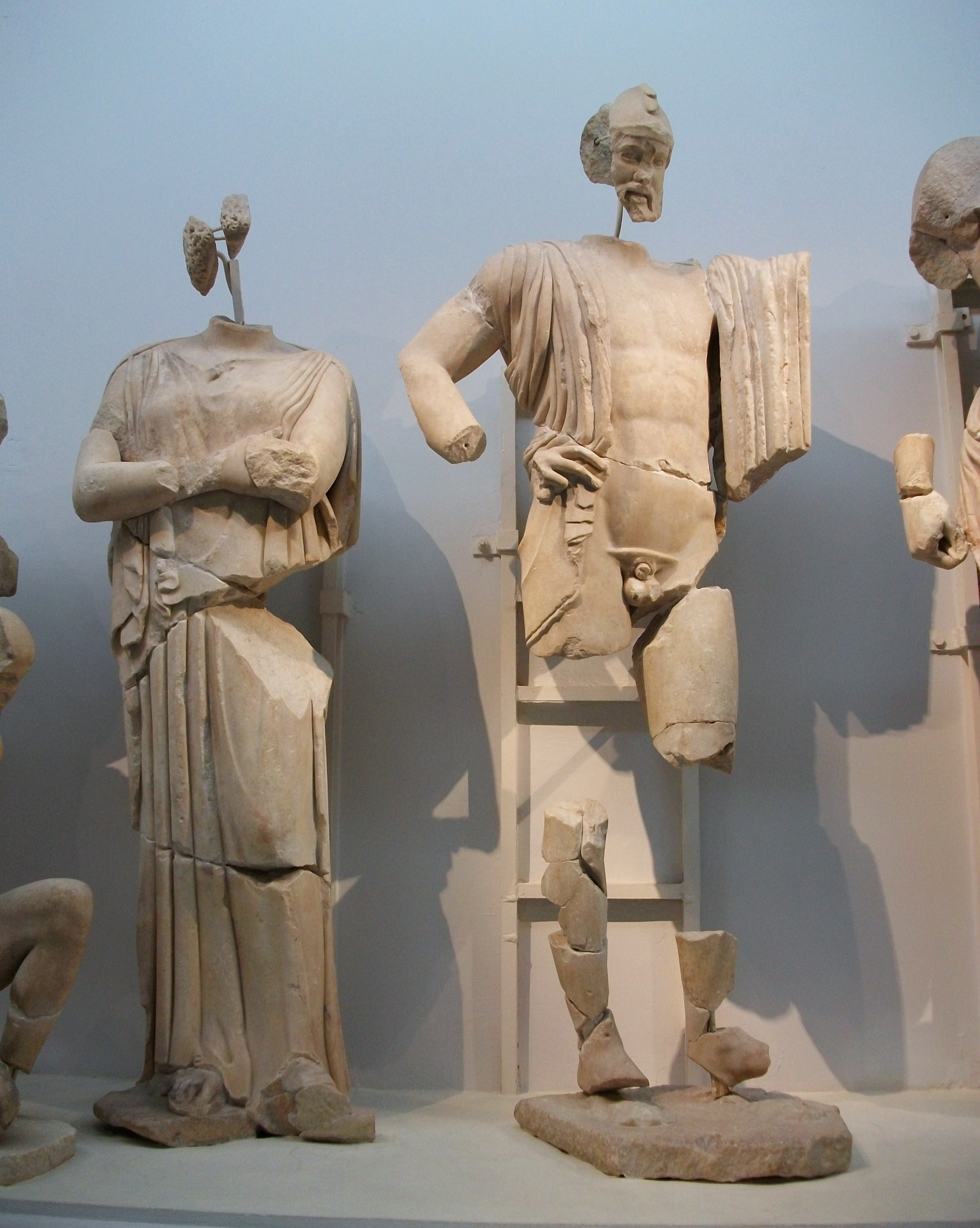
Oenomaus next to Sterope about to race against Pelops from the East pediment of the temple of Zeus, Archaeological Museum of Olympia.

In Greek mythology, King Oenomaus (also Oenamaus; Ancient Greek: Οἰνόμαος, romanized: Oinómaos, lit. 'wine man', 'striving for wine', or 'eager for wine') of Pisa, was the father of Hippodamia and the son of Ares. His name Oinomaos denotes a wine man.

A typical Jupiter Trojan asteroid discovered in 2007 was named in honor of Oenomaus.

== Family ==
Oenomaeus' mother was either naiad Harpina (daughter of the river god Phliasian Asopus) or Sterope, one of the Pleiades, whom some identify as his consort instead.

He married, if not Sterope, then Evarete of Argos, the daughter of Acrisius and Eurydice. Yet others give Eurythoe, daughter of Danaus, either as his mother or consort. His children besides Hippodamia were Leucippus (who perished because of his love for Daphne) and Alcippe (mother of Marpessa by Evenus). Pausanias, who is generally skeptical about stories of humans descending from gods, makes Oenomaus son of a mortal father, Alxion. John Tzetzes adduces a version which, in the same vein, calls Oenomaus son of a Hyperochus by Sterope. The genealogy offered in the earliest literary reference, Euripides' Iphigenia in Tauris, would place him two generations before the Trojan War, making him the great-grandfather of the Atreides, Agamemnon and Menelaus.

Comparative table of Oenomaus' family
Relation	Names	Sources											
Relation	Names	Euripides	Scholia on Apollonius	Diodorus Siculus	Parthenius	Apollodorus	Plutarch	Dio Chrysostom	Hyginus	Pausanias	Philostratus	Eusebius	Tzetzes
Parentage	Ares and Eurythoe		✓										
Parentage	Ares and Harpina			✓						✓			
Parentage	Ares and (A)Sterope								✓				
Parentage	Ares and Asterie								✓				
Parentage	Alxion									✓			
Parentage	Aethlius											✓	
Parentage	Hyperochus and Sterope												✓
Spouse	Sterope					✓			✓	✓			
Spouse	Evarete								✓				
Spouse	Eurythoe												✓
Children	Hippodamia	✓ (not named)				✓		✓	✓	✓	✓		
Children	Leucippus				✓					✓			
Children	Alcippe						✓						

== Mythology ==
=== Courtship of Hippodamia ===
King Oenomaus, fearful of a prophecy that claimed he would be killed by his son-in-law, had killed eighteen suitors of his daughter Hippodamia after defeating them in a chariot race. He affixed their heads to the wooden columns of his palace. Pausanias was shown what was purportedly the last standing column in the late 2nd century AD; he mentions that Pelops erected a monument in honor of all the suitors who preceded him, and lists their names:

1. Marmax
2. Alcathous, son of Porthaon
3. Euryalus
4. Eurymachus
5. Crotalus
6. Acrias of Lacedaemon, founder of Acriae
7. Capetus
8. Lycurgus
9. Lasius
10. Chalcodon
11. Tricolonus
12. Aristomachus
13. Prias
14. Pelagon
15. Aeolius
16. Cronius
17. Erythras, son of Leucon
18. Eioneus, son of Magnes

Alternatively, the reason Oenomaus wouldn't allow his daughter to marry was because he himself was in love with her.

=== Death ===
Pelops son of King Tantalus of Lydia, came to ask for her hand and prepared to race Oenomaus. Worried about losing, Pelops went to the seaside and invoked Poseidon, his former lover. Reminding Poseidon of their love ("Aphrodite's sweet gifts"), he asked Poseidon for help. Smiling, Poseidon caused a chariot drawn by winged horses to appear. Pelops and Hippodamia, very much in love, devised a plan to replace the bronze linchpins attaching the wheels to the chariot axle with fake ones made of beeswax. The race began, and went on for a long time. But just as Oenomaus was catching up to Pelops and readying to kill him, the wheels flew off and the chariot broke apart. Oenomaus' charioteer, Myrtilus, survived, but Oenomaus was dragged to death by his horses.

Pelops then killed Myrtilus (by throwing him off a cliff into the sea as he cursed him) after the latter attempted to claim Hippodamia. As Myrtilus died, he cursed Pelops. This was the source of the curse that haunted descendants of Pelops', including Atreus, Thyestes, Agamemnon, Aegisthus, Menelaus and Orestes. Also, the burial place of Myrtilus was a taraxippus in Olympia, a "horse-frightening place" during races.

In memory of Oenomaus, the Olympic Games were created (or alternatively the Olympic Games were in celebration of Pelops' victory). Oenomaus' chariot race was one legendary origin of the Olympic Games; one of its turning-posts was preserved, and round it grew an Elean legend of a burnt "house of Oenomaus", reported by Pausanias in the 2nd century AD.

== Bibliography ==
- Pindar, Olympian Ode, I (476 BCE)
- Sophocles, Electra, 504 (430–415 BCE) and Oenomaus, Fr. 433 (408 BCE)
- Euripides, Orestes, 1024-1062 (408 BCE)
- Bibliotheca, Epitome 2, 1–9 (140 BCE)
- Diodorus Siculus, Histories, 4.73 (1st century BCE)
- Hyginus, Fables, 84: Oinomaus; Poetic Astronomy, ii (1st century CE)
- Pausanias, Description of Greece, 5.1.3–7; 5.13.1; 6.21.9; 8.14.10–11 (c. 160 – 176 CE)
- Philostratus the Elder Imagines, I.30: Pelops (c. 190 – c. 230 CE)
- Philostratus the Younger, Imagines, 9: Pelops (3rd century CE)
- First Vatican Mythographer, 22: Myrtilus; Atreus et Thyestes
- Second Vatican Mythographer, 146: Oenomaus
