= Iphis =

Daughter of Ligdus

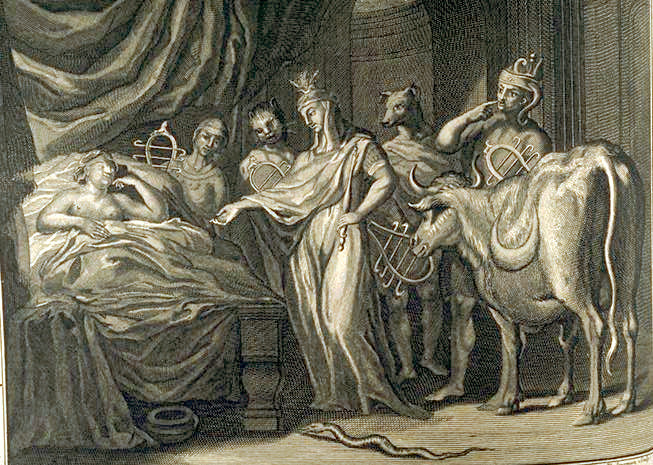
Isis and Telethusa by Picart, 1732.

In Greek and Roman mythology, Iphis (/ˈaɪfɪs/ EYE-fis or /ˈɪfɪs/ IF-iss; Ancient Greek: Ἶφις, romanized: Îphis [îː.pʰis], gen. Ἴφιδος Íphidos) was a child of Telethusa and Ligdus in Crete, born female and raised as male, who was later transformed by the goddess Isis into a man.

== Mythology ==
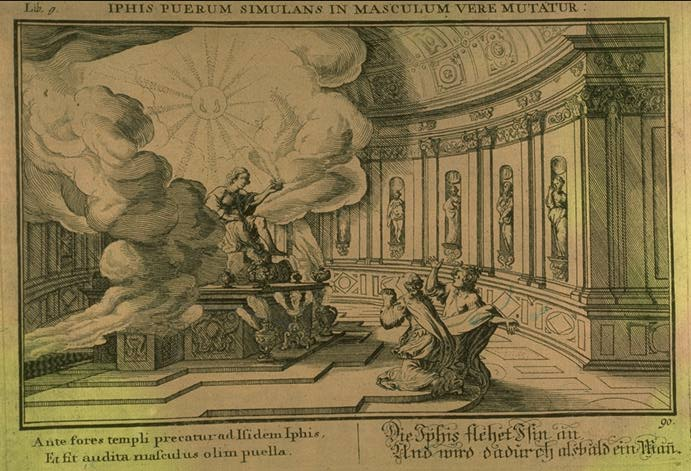
Isis changing the sex of Iphis. Engraving by Bauer, 1703.

According to Ovid's Metamorphoses, in the city of Phaistos, there lived an honorable man named Ligdus and his pregnant wife, Telethusa. As Telethusa's due date drew near, Ligdus informed her of his desire for a son, since the couple could not afford a dowry for a daughter. He also warned her, that if the child was female, she would have to be put to death. Telethusa tried in vain to change her husband's mind, but Ligdus, despite his own despair, held firm.

However, Telethusa was soon visited in the middle of the night by the Egyptian goddess Isis, along with a train of other gods: Anubis, Bastet, Apis, Harpocrates, Osiris, and the Egyptian serpent. Isis advised her despondent follower to disobey her husband's orders and keep the child, regardless of its sex. Isis also promised to aid Telethusa and her child in any future troubles. When Telethusa gave birth to a girl, she concealed the infant's sex from her husband and conspired with her nursemaid to raise her child as a son. The child was named Iphis, a name Telethusa secretly rejoiced in, as it was gender neutral.

When Iphis turned 13, Ligdus, still ignorant of Iphis' true sex, arranged for her to marry the daughter of Telestes, Ianthe, who was "praised by all the women of Phaistos for the dower of her unequalled beauty." The two young women, who had been instructed alongside each other and shared the same teachers, fell deeply in love. As described by Ovid, Ianthe waited in confidence for their promised union, believing she would wed a man. In contrast, Iphis loved Ianthe without hope, burdened by the knowledge of her womanhood. As Iphis lamented to the goddess Juno and the god Hymenaios:

"O what will be the awful dreaded end, with such a monstrous love compelling me? If the Gods should wish to save me, certainly they should have saved me; but, if their desire was for my ruin, still they should have given some natural suffering of humanity. The passion for a cow does not inflame a cow, no mare has ever sought another mare. The ram inflames the ewe, and every doe follows a chosen stag; so also birds are mated, and in all the animal world no female ever feels love passion for another female—why is it in me?"

Telethusa attempted to delay the wedding, knowing that it would lead to the discovery of her ruse, but soon exhausted every avenue of excuse. The day before the wedding, Telethusa, now desperate, brought her daughter with her to the temple of Isis. Together, the two offered their jewelry and prayed for any type of aid. In response to their prayers, the altar moved and the temple doors shook. Pleased by the omen, Telethusa left the temple with Iphis, only to find her daughter transformed. As described by Ovid:

Her face seemed of a darker hue, her strength seemed greater, and her features were more stern. Her hair once long, was unadorned and short. There is more vigor in her than she showed in her girl ways. For in the name of truth, Iphis, who was a girl, is now a man!

After being transformed into a man, Telethusa and Iphis erected a tablet at the temple to commemorate the miracle. The next day, Iphis happily married Ianthe in a ceremony presided over by Juno, Hymenaios, and Venus.

== Interpretations ==
The story of Iphis and Ianthe is the only mythological account of female same-sex desire, not only in Ovid, but in all of Graeco-Roman mythology. Whether Ovid disapproves of or is sympathetic toward female homoerotic desire has been a point of contention for scholars. The main social inscription in this myth is the need for a male heir in a patriarchal society and the inevitable misogyny this creates.

The story of Iphis is similar to that of Leucippus from Phaistos, Crete, and could be a variant thereof.

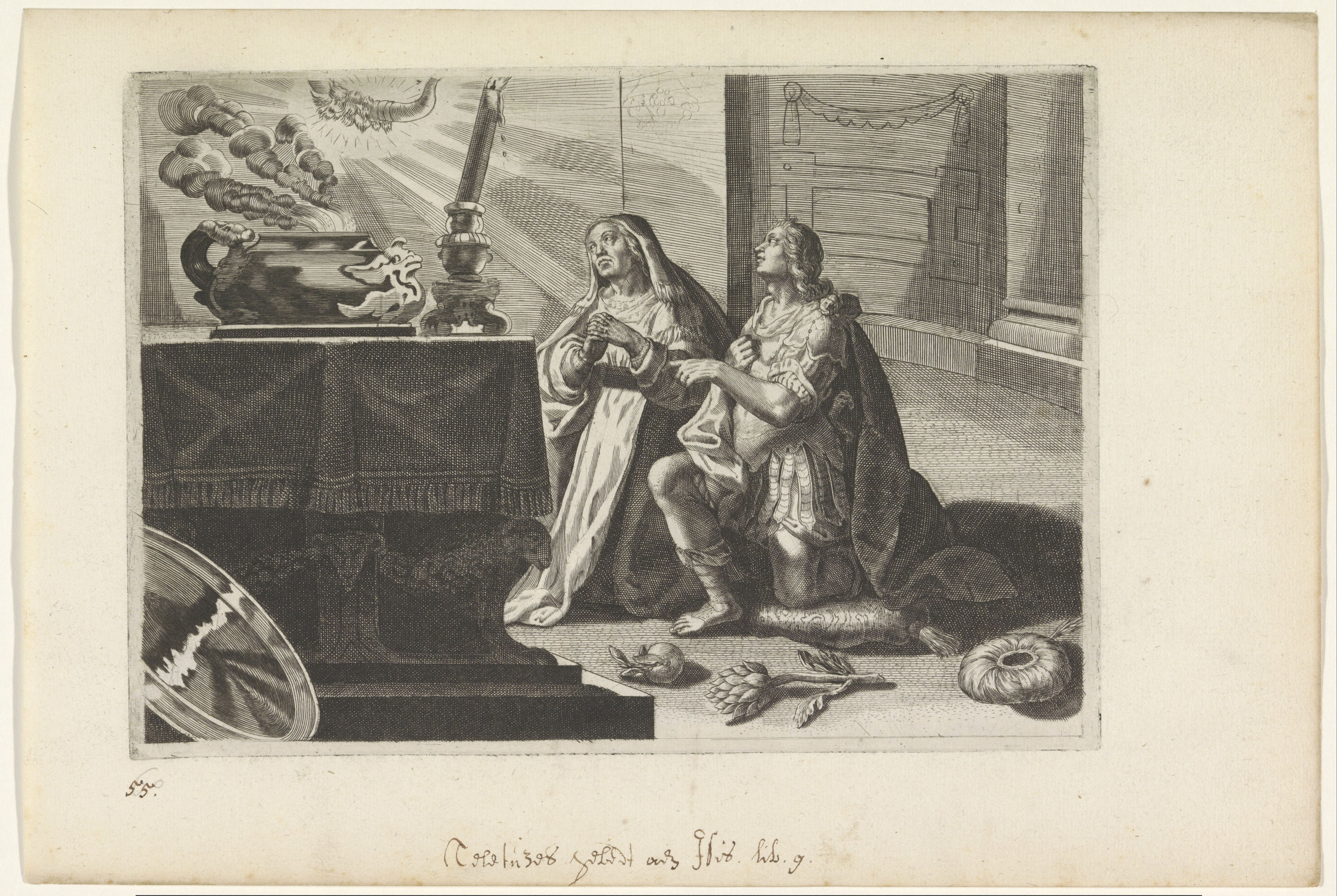
Telethusa and Iphis pray to Isis by Crispijn van de Passe II, circa 1636-1670

== In popular culture ==
The 17th-century publisher Humphrey Moseley once claimed to possess a manuscript of a play based on the Iphis and Ianthe story by William Shakespeare. Scholars have treated the claim with intense skepticism; the play has not survived.

== See also ==
- Leucippus of Crete, Greek mythological character, transformed into a man by the goddess Leto
