= Telethusa =

Telethusa or Telethousa (Ancient Greek: Τελέθουσα) was the Cretan mother of Iphis by Ligdus in Greek mythology.

== Mythology ==
Telethusa was told by her husband Ligdus that if she gave birth to a girl, the child would be put to death. But when the child was about to be born Telethusa had a vision in her dreams in which Isis, in the company of other Egyptian gods (Anubis, Bubastis, Apis, Harpocrates and Osiris), told her not to obey her husband's orders. Doing as the vision said, Telethusa then raised her daughter Iphis as a boy to spare her from Ligdus's wrath. Iphis was later transformed into a man by the Egyptian goddess Isis in order to marry his true love, the maiden Ianthe.
