= Leucippus of Crete =

Greek mythical figure whose gender is changed

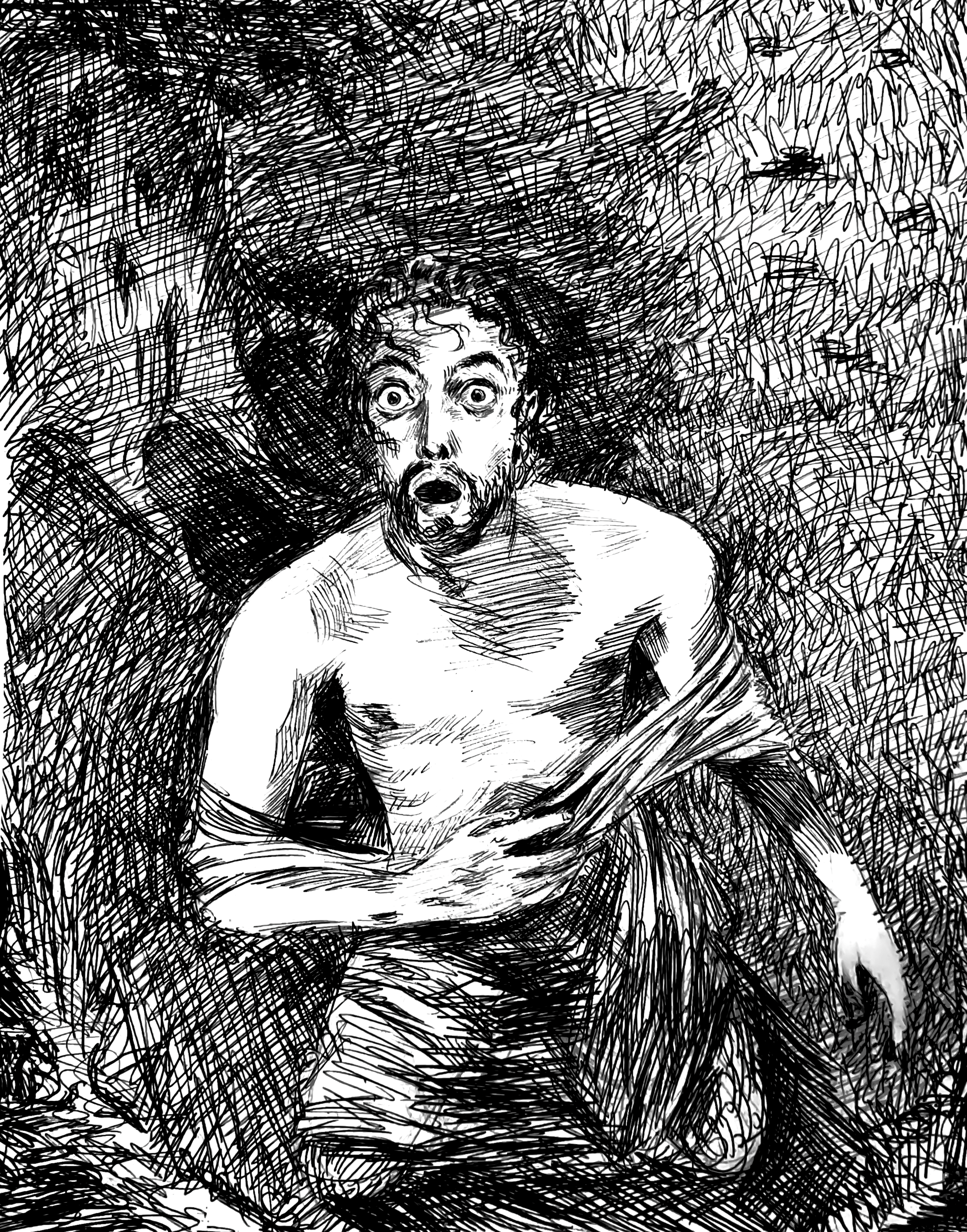
Contemporary depiction of Leucippus removing his peplos.

In Greek mythology, Leucippus (Ancient Greek: Λεύκιππος, romanized: Leúkippos, lit. 'white horse') was a young man of Phaistos, Crete. Leucippus was born to Lamprus, the son of Pandion, and Galatea, daughter of Eurytius the son of Sparton. He is notable for having undergone a magical gender transformation by the will of the goddess Leto. Due to his transition, Leucippus can be considered a transgender male figure in Greek mythology.

His story was included in the Metamorphoses by Antoninus Liberalis. It shares several elements with the myth of Iphis, another female Cretan child raised as and transformed into a male from Ovid's poem the Metamorphoses.

== Mythology ==
Leucippus was born in Phaistos, Crete. When his mother Galatea was pregnant, her husband Lamprus told her he would only accept a male child. Galatea gave birth while Lamprus was away pasturing his cattle, and the infant was female. Following the advice of seers, Galatea gave her child a masculine name, Leucippus, and told her husband that she had given birth to a son.

Leucippus was raised as a boy, but upon approaching puberty, it became necessary to conceal his female sex from Lamprus, presumably to avoid drawing his ire. Galatea went to the sanctuary of Leto and prayed that Leucippus could become male. Leto took pity on Galatea and her child, and thus granted the prayer and changed Leucippus into a boy.

In commemoration of this event, the people of Phaistos surnamed Leto Phytia (from Greek φύω "to grow"). They established a rite of passage feast in honor of Leto, which was called Ecdysia (from Greek ἑκδύω "to undress"). It was named for Leucippus who was able to remove his "maidenly" peplos after his transformation. The festival became an annual initiation ritual, focused on the transition of boys to men as they joined the youth corps, agela. The "young [men] were required to put on women's clothes and swear an oath of citizenship," after which "herds of youth [would] strip off their peploi publicly," reenacting Leucippus's transformation.

It became a custom for brides and bridal couples of Phaistos to lie beside an image or statue of Leucippus before weddings.

== See also ==
- Iphis of Crete, child of Ligdus and Telethusa, magically transformed into a man by the goddess Isis
- Caeneus, transformed into an invincible man by Poseidon, later defeated by Centaurs
- Teiresias, who had clairvoyance and was being transformed into a woman for seven years
- Mnestra, who Poseidon gave the ability to change shape at will
- Siproites of Crete, who was transformed into a woman for having seen Artemis bathing
