= Eurypyle (maenad) =

In Greek mythology, Eurypyle (Ancient Greek: Εὐρυπύλη, lit. 'wide-gated' or 'wide gate') was a maenad. She was a follower of Dionysus and was killed by Morrheus.
