= Galatea (mythology) =

Figures in Greek mythology

In Greek mythology, Galatea (/ˌɡæləˈtiːə/; Ancient Greek: Γαλάτεια; "she who is milk-white") was the name of the following figures:

- Galatea, a Nereid who loved the shepherd Acis, and was loved by the cyclops Polyphemus.
- Galatea, the post-antiquity name given to the statue of a woman created by Pygmalion and brought to life by Aphrodite.
- Galatea, daughter of Eurytius, son of Sparton. She married a man of good family but poor, Lamprus. When she became pregnant, Lamprus wished to have a son and told her to expose the child if it turned out to be a girl. Galatea gave birth to a girl while Lamprus was away, so she—with the advice of seers and her own dreams—told Lamprus that the baby was male, and named her Leucippus. As Leucippus grew older, her true sex became harder and harder to conceal, so Galatea went to the sanctuary of Leto and prayed to the goddess to change her daughter into a man. Leto took pity on mother and daughter and made Leucippus an actual man.
