= Lamprus (mythology) =

Cretan man in Greek mythology

In Greek mythology, Lamprus (Ancient Greek: Λάμπρος, romanized: Lampros, lit. 'shining, distinguished, munificent') was the son of Pandion from Phaistos in Crete and father of Leucippus by Galatea.

== Mythology ==
Lamprus, who was from a good family but without any fortune, married Galatea and the couple was soon expecting. Lamprus wished for a son, and told his wife that if the baby turned out to be a girl, they would expose it. One day while he was tending to their flocks, Galatea gave birth to a girl but pitying her child she lied to Lamprus and told him she had had a son. Galatea named the child Leucippus ("white horse") and raised her as a boy for some years. But as Leucippus grew and hit puberty, her true sex became impossible to conceal anymore, and Galatea began fearing Lamprus's reaction should he find out the truth. She then prayed to the goddess Leto to change Leucippus into a real boy, and the goddess answered her prayers accordingly.
