= Thespius =

Legendary founder and king of Thespiae

In Greek mythology, Thespius (/ˈθɛspiəs/; Ancient Greek: Θέσπιος, romanized: Théspios, lit. 'inspired by the gods' or 'divinely spoken/ inspired') or Thestius (/ˈθɛstʃəs, ˈθɛstiəs/; Ancient Greek: Θέστιος, romanized: Théstios) was a legendary founder and king of Thespiae, Boeotia. His life account is considered part of Greek mythology.

== Biography ==
Thespius was reportedly son of Erechtheus, King of Athens, and possibly Praxithea, daughter of Phrasimus and Diogeneia. He was probably the brother of Protogeneia, Pandora, Procris, Creusa, Oreithyia, Chthonia, Merope, Cecrops, Pandorus, Metion, Orneus, Eupalamus and Sicyon. Other sources called him a descendant of Erechtheus while some said that he was the son of Teuthras, son of Pandion or Cepheus.

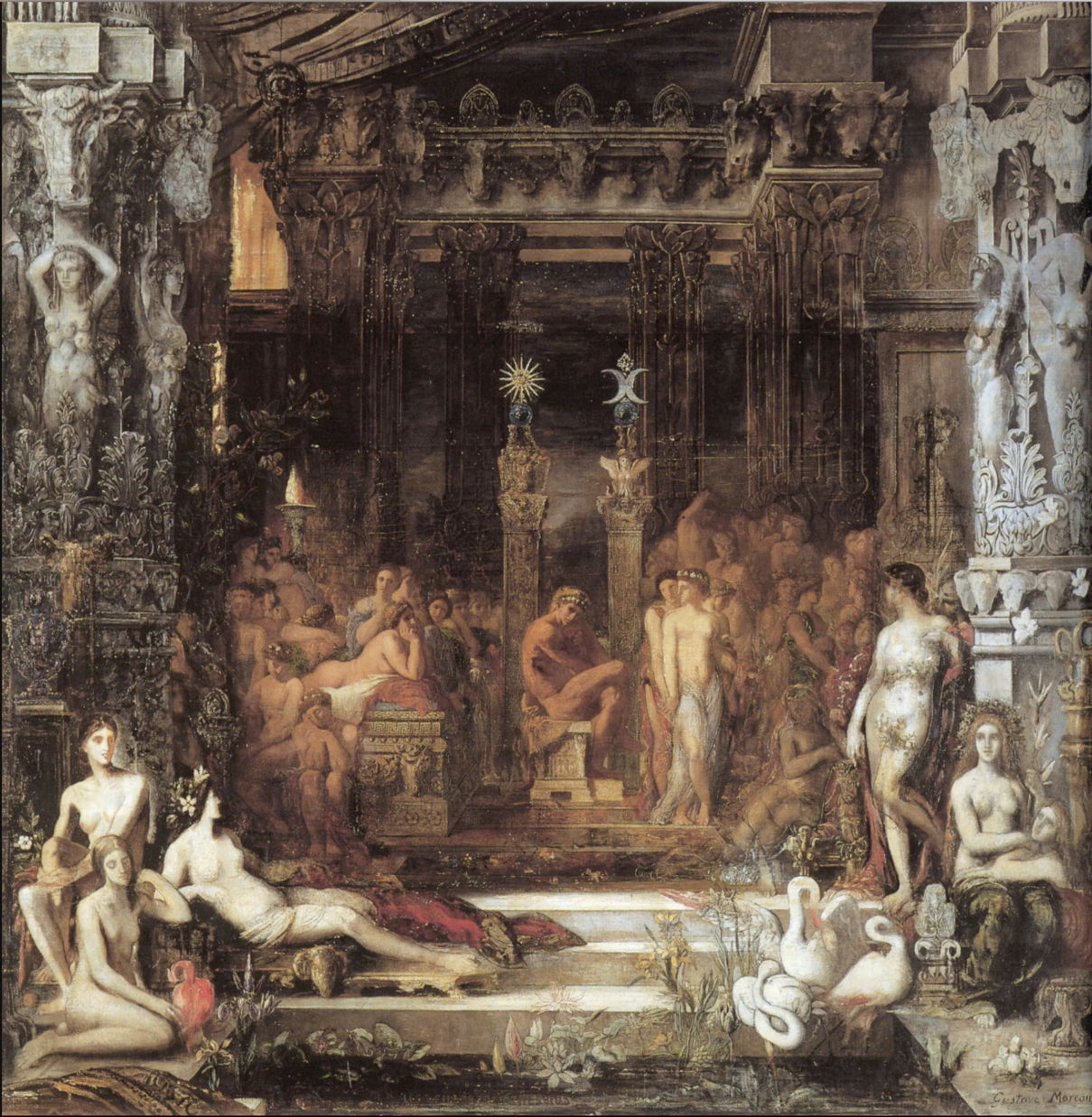
Gustave Moreau, Daughters of Thespius (1853). Musée national Gustave Moreau

Thespius' maternal grandparents were Phrasimus and Diogenia, the daughter of the river god Cephissus. He married Megamede, daughter of Arneus. They supposedly had fifty daughters together, although Thespius may have fathered some of the daughters from unnamed mistresses with Megamede being their stepmother. The daughters are often referred to as the Thespiades, also being the subject of an 1853 painting by Gustave Moreau.

== Mythology ==
All his daughters came of marrying age but Thespius seems to have sought no husband for them; he instead desired grandchildren from the hero Heracles. When Heracles was assigned to kill the Lion of Cithaeron (not to be confused with the Nemean Lion), Thespius offered his fifty daughters as a prize. The hunt for the lion lasted fifty days, and during each night of the hunt Heracles slept with each of the fifty daughters, who in turn each gave birth to one son.

Alternate sources claim that Heracles slept with the daughters in a single night. In this version, only forty-nine slept with the hero, with the fiftieth being destined to serve as a virgin priestess of a temple to Heracles, as a punishment for her refusal to sleep with him. In another version, the eldest and the youngest daughters had twins, resulting in fifty-one grandsons of Thespius, forty of which colonized the island of Sardinia.

== Descendants ==
The Bibliotheca of Pseudo-Apollodorus lists the following daughters and grandsons. The grandsons were all Heracleidae in the wider sense of the term.

According to Hellanicus, a certain Stephanephoros (Στεφανηφόρος; "crown bearer") was called one of the sons of Heracles who were born from the daughters of Thestios.

Daughter	Grandson	Daughter	Grandson
Aeschreis	Leucones	Hippocrate	Hippozygus
Aglaia	Antiades	Iphis	Celeustanor
Anthea	Unknown grandsons	Laothoe	Antiphus
Anthippe	Hippodromus	Lyse	Eumedes
Antiope	Alopius	Lysidice	Teles
Argele	Cleolaus	Lysippe	Erasippus
Asopis	Mentor	Marse	Bucolus
Calametis	Astybies	Meline	Laomedon
Certhe	Iobes	Menippis	Entelides
Chryseis	Onesippus	Nice	Nicodromus
Clytippe	Eurycapys	Nicippe	Antimachus
Elachia	Buleus	Olympusa	Halocrates
Eone	Amestrius	Oria	Laomenes
Epilais	Astyanax	Panope	Threpsippas
Erato	Dynastes	Patro	Archemachus
Euboea	Olympus	Phyleis	Tigasis
Eubote	Eurypylus	Praxithea	Nephus
Eurybia	Polylaus	Procris	Antileon and Hippeus
Euryce	Teleutagoras	Pyrippe	Patroclus
Eurypyle	Archedicus	Stratonice	Atromus
Eurytele	Leucippus	Terpsicrate	Euryopes
Exole	Erythras	Tiphyse	Lyncaeus
Heliconis	Phalias	Toxicrate	Lycurgus
Hesychia	Oestrobles	Xanthis	Homolippus
Hippo	Capylus	Unknown daughter (Euryte?)	Creon
