= Arneus =

In Greek mythology, Arneus (Ancient Greek: Ἄρνεος) was the father of Megamede who became the mother of the 50 daughters of King Thespius of Thespiae. In other versions of the myth, these daughters were born from different unnamed mistresses of the ruler.
