= Megamede =

In Greek mythology, Megamede (Ancient Greek: Μεγαμήδη, lit. 'great council', 'great cunning' or 'great protector/ ruler') was the daughter of Arneus who became the wife of King Thespius of Thespiae and mothered his 50 daughters who consorted with Heracles. Otherwise, these maidens were born from numerous concubines of Thespius.
