= Iolaus =

Nephew of Heracles in Greek mythology

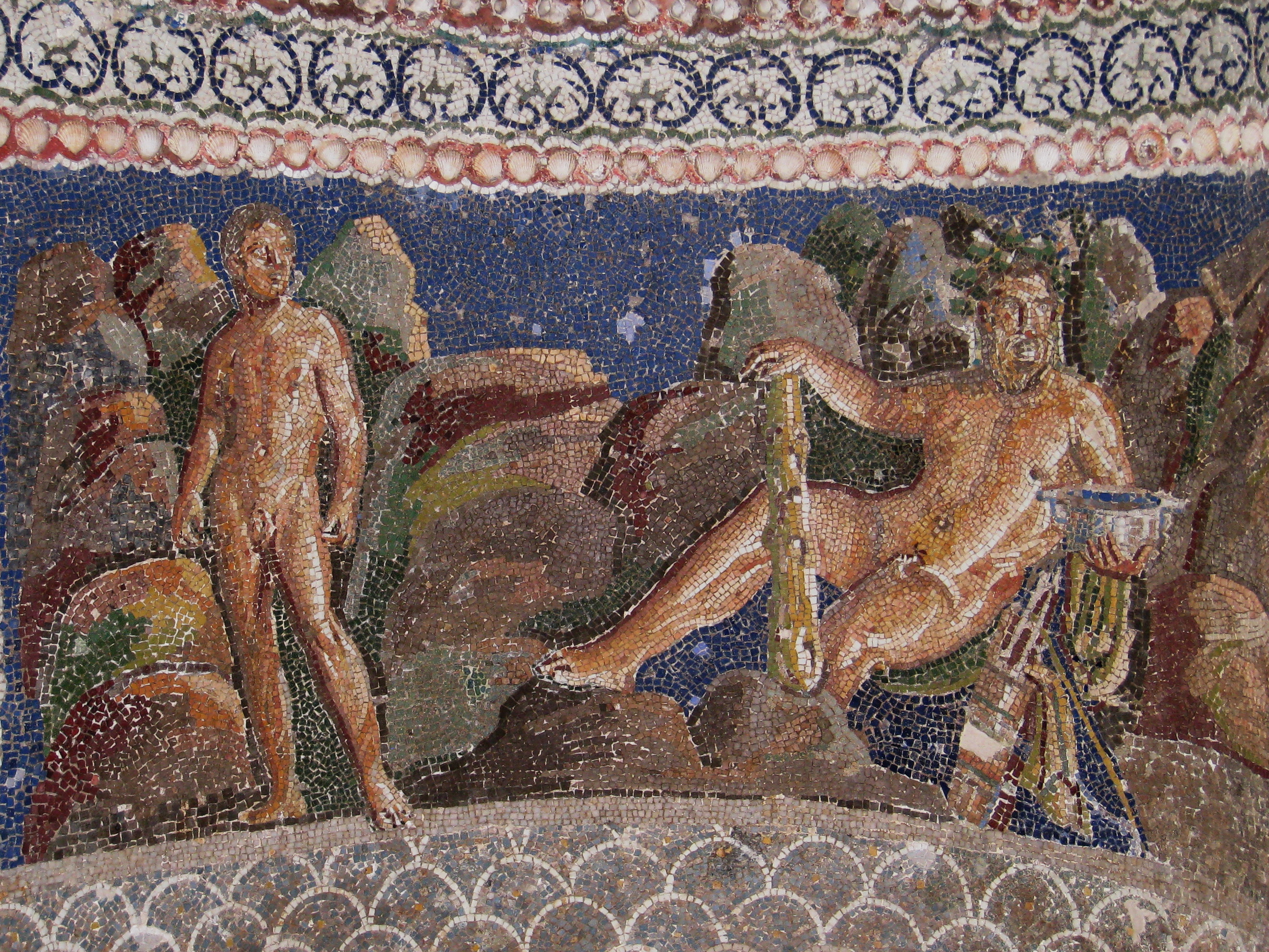
Heracles and his nephew, Iolaus. 1st century BC mosaic from the Anzio Nymphaeum, Rome.

In Greek mythology, Iolaus (/aɪoʊˈleɪəs/; Ancient Greek: Ἰόλαος Iólāos) was a Theban divine hero. He was famed for being Heracles's charioteer and squire, and for helping with some of his Labors, as well as for being one of the Argonauts.

== Family ==
Iolaus was the son of Iphicles and Automedusa, daughter of King Alcathous of Megara. According to Plutarch, Heracles gave his wife, Megara, age thirty three, to Iolaus, then only sixteen years old. According to Pausanias, who cites Hesiod as the source, they had a daughter, Leipephilene, though the name is corrupt and has been amended by various editors to "Leipephile" (Λειπεφίλη), "Hippophile" (Ἱπποφίλη) or "Deiphile" (Δηιφίλη). Through this daughter, Iolaus was considered to have fathered the mythic and historic line of the kings of Corinth, ending with Telestes.

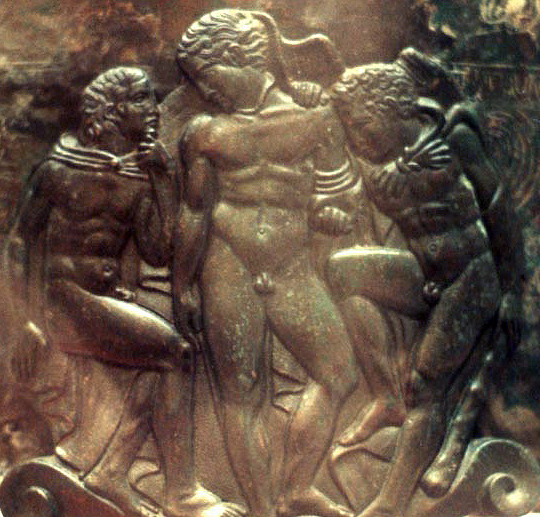
Repoussé and engraved relief of Hercules (right), Eros (center) and Iolaus (left) on the Ficoroni cista. 4th century BC Etruscan ritual vessel

== Mythology ==
=== Relationship with Heracles ===
Iolaus often acted as Heracles's charioteer and companion. Plutarch, describing the Theban Sacred Band in his life of Pelopidas, said "It is a tradition likewise that Iolaus, who assisted Hercules in his labours and fought at his side, was beloved of him; and Aristotle observes that, even in his time, lovers plighted their faith at Iolaus's tomb."

Plutarch also described Heracles's male lovers in the Amatorius, saying there were too many to count, but that Iolaus and Admetus were two of the most notable. He said that Iolaus was honored by many for this love, and that it was popular for lovers to make reciprocal vows of affection at his tomb.

=== Adventures ===
Iolaus provided essential help to Heracles in his battle against the Hydra, his second labor. Seeing that Heracles was being overwhelmed by the multi-headed monster (the Lernaean Hydra), who grew two heads in place of each one cut off, Iolaus helped by cauterizing each neck as Heracles beheaded it.

According to Diodorus Siculus, Iolaus was sent by Heracles to Sardinia, together with nine of the sons that he had with the fifty daughters of Thespius (the Thespiades), to colonize the island, giving rise to the Iolei people.

Iolaus and the Thespians were buried in Sardinia.

Aristotle said that Sardinia had practiced the rite of incubation, which is the liberation ritual of the people who were affected by nightmares and obsessions. These rituals included that the persons suffering from nightmares should sleep next to the tombs of heroes.

Simplicius of Cilicia adds, in the eight books of the Commentaries Aristotle, that "the places where they were deposited and preserved corpses of the nine heroes that Heracles got from the Thespians and who came to Sardinia with the colony of Iolaus, became the famous oracles."

Solinus says: "The Iolians, so named by him (Iolaus), added a temple to his tomb, because he had freed Sardinia from many ills".

== Legacy ==
The Theban gymnasium was named after Iolaus because it was next to his tomb and the Heracleia, an annual festival in honor of Heracles, was held there, hence also known as Iolaeia, Iolaia or Iolaea (Greek: Ιολάεια), an athletic festival consisting of gymnastic and equestrian events. The victors at the Iolaea were crowned with garlands of myrtle.

A genus of Lycaenid butterfly has been named after him.

An exoplanet around star HAT-P-42 (now named Lerna) is named after him as part of the IAU's NameExoWorlds project.

There is a card and board game named after Iolaus and published by Hasbro, a variation of Gin Rummy.

== See also ==
- Hylas
- Norax
- Sardus
