= Lion of Cithaeron =

Ancient Greek mythological lion

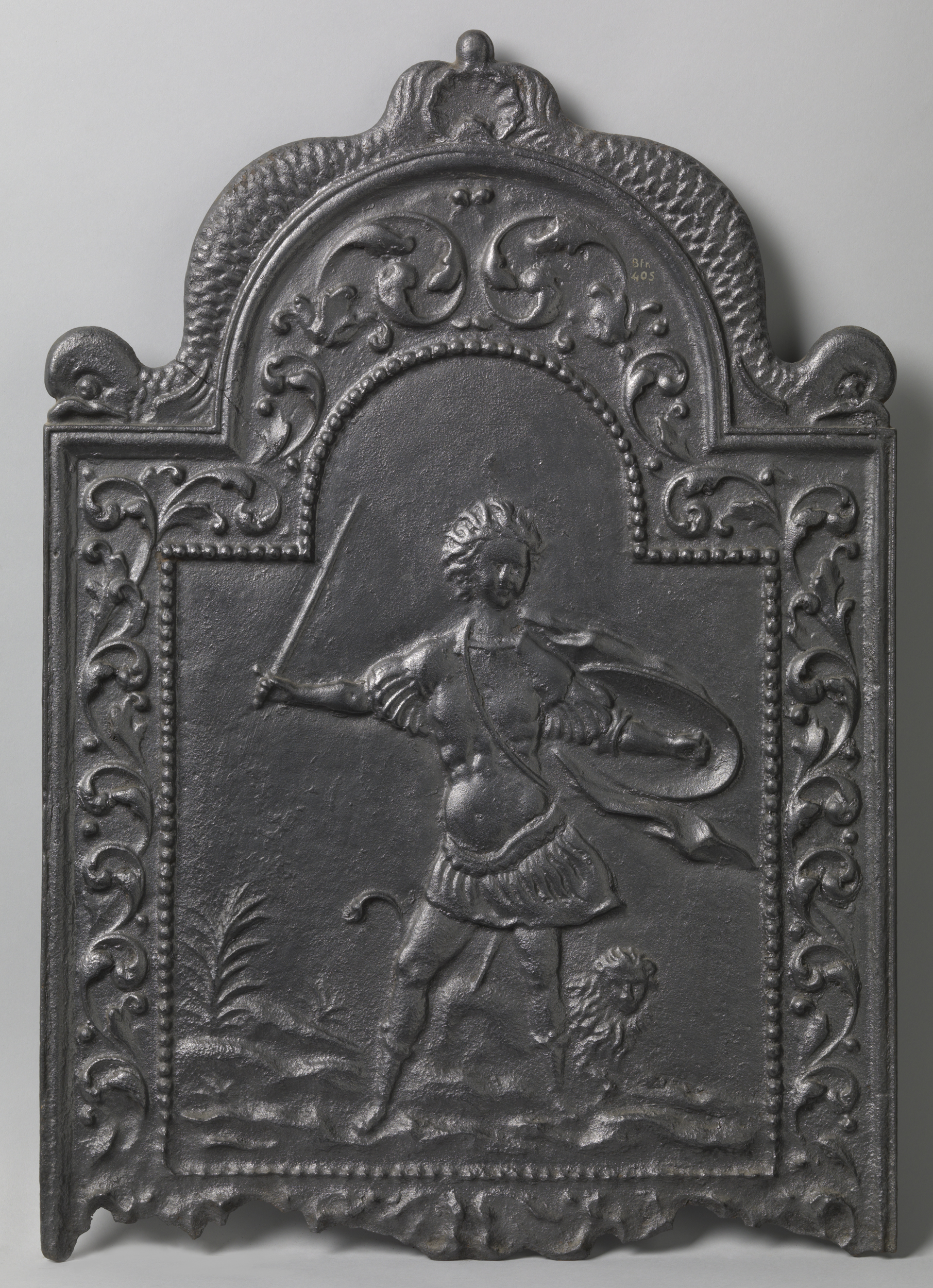
Hercules and the Lion of Cithaeron (German fireback, 17th century)

The Lion of Cithaeron (Note: Which is also spelled Kathairon or Kithairon, and the beast is thus sometimes called the Lion of Kathairon.) was a lion in Greek mythology which harassed the lands of king Amphitryon and king Thespius or of king Megareus. Some myths say that it was killed by Heracles, while others say it was slain by Alcathous of Elis.

According to the Suda, it was also called the Thespian lion and the Ravine lion (Ancient Greek: Χαραδραῖος λέων, Charadraios leōn) because it lived in a place called "Ravine" (Ancient Greek: χαράδρα, charadra).

== Heracles ==
One account of the myth, recorded by Apollodorus in the Bibliotheca, states that the lion came from Cithaeron to hunt the cattle belonging to Amphitryon and to King Thespius of Thespiae. When Heracles was eighteen years old, Thespius asked him to kill the lion. The hunt took Heracles fifty days, during which Thespius hosted him (and each night of which Heracles slept with a different daughter of the king). After Heracles slew the lion, he dressed himself in its skin and wore its scalp as a helmet. According to the Suda, it was killed near Thespiae, before Heracles killed the Nemean lion.

== Alcathous ==
According to Pausanias, writing in the second century BC, the Megarians believed that the Cithaeronian Lion killed many people, including Euippus, the son of their king Megareus. Consequently, Megareus promised that whoever killed the Lion would marry his daughter and inherit his throne. Alcathous killed the lion and when he became the king, he built the temple of Artemis Agrotera (Huntress) (Ancient Greek: Ἀγροτέραν Ἄρτεμιν) and Apollo Agraeus (Hunter) (Ancient Greek: Ἀπόλλωνα Ἀγραῖον).

== See also ==
- Nemean lion
- List of mythological lions
