= Thespiae =

Ancient Greek city-state

- Θεσπιαί (Ancient Greek)
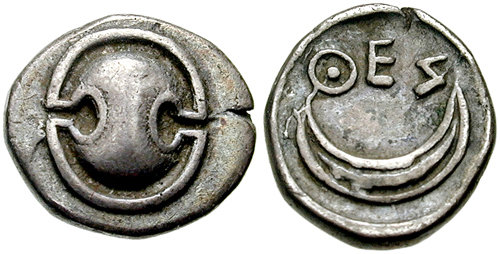
- Silver Obol from Thespiae, 431-424 BCE. Obverse: Boeotian shield. Reverse: crescent, ΘΕΣ[ΠΙΕΩΝ] (of the Thespians).

- Location of Thespiae in Boeotia, Greece
- 38°17′36″N 23°09′04″E
- Type: Ancient city
- Periods: Archaic, Classical, Hellenistic, Roman
- Cultures: Ancient Greek

History
- Built: Before c. 750 BCE

Site notes
- Excavation dates: 1882
- Archaeologists: Panagiotis Stamatakis
- Condition: Ruined

Thespiae (/ˈθɛspi.iː/ THESP-ee-ee; Ancient Greek: Θεσπιαί, romanized: Thespiaí) was an ancient Greek city (polis) in Boeotia. It sits at the foot of Mount Helicon and near right bank of the Thespius River (modern name Kanavari River).

Thespiae was a Boeotian state sporadically involved in the military federal league known as the Boeotian League. The Boeotian League began in 520 BCE under the leadership of Thebes.

During the Second Persian invasion of Greece, Thespiae's 700 hoplites remained with the Spartans in the Battle of Thermopylae, fighting the Persians and allowing the Greek forces to retreat. Centuries later Greece honored them with a monument. Thespiae was one of the few Boeotian cities to stay loyal to Greece after the battle. Thespiae rivaled Thebes and survived through the Roman Empire.

Thespiae was involved in mythical Greek tales depicting creatures such as the Lion of Cithaeron and a dragon that ate people whole. Mythical figures like Heracles and Narcissus also interacted with the environment of Thespiae.

Thespiae's religious practices included worshiping Eros and the Muses. Artists such as Praxiteles and Lysippos honored Eros through sculptures. Citizens held festivals and competitions dedicated to the Muses and Eros.

== Etymology ==
Its citizens are called Thespians which holds no correlation with the common noun thespian meaning "actor". The noun comes from the legendary first actor named Thespis. Both Thespis and Thespiae, however, are derived from the noun θέσπις (théspis, meaning 'divine inspiration').

== Topography ==
According to the historian Anthony Snodgrass, during Thespian periods of control over smaller cities like Siphai and their harbors, Thespiae created a "natural steppingstone" effect through a sea route it could use without going through and being subject to powerful states like Athens. Thespiae was at a geographic advantage to choose between allying with Athens and Sparta, and its close ally Platea. The geography and demographic changes of Thespiae after the decrease in the hoplite class is thought to have allowed Thespiae to make a decision to oppose Thebes and leave the Boeotian League.

== Archeology ==
The probable remains of the ancient acropolis consists of an oval line of fortification, while the ground to the east and south are covered with foundations. Topographer Martin William Leake noted that the unique fortified enclosure implied that many of the other buildings stood without walls.

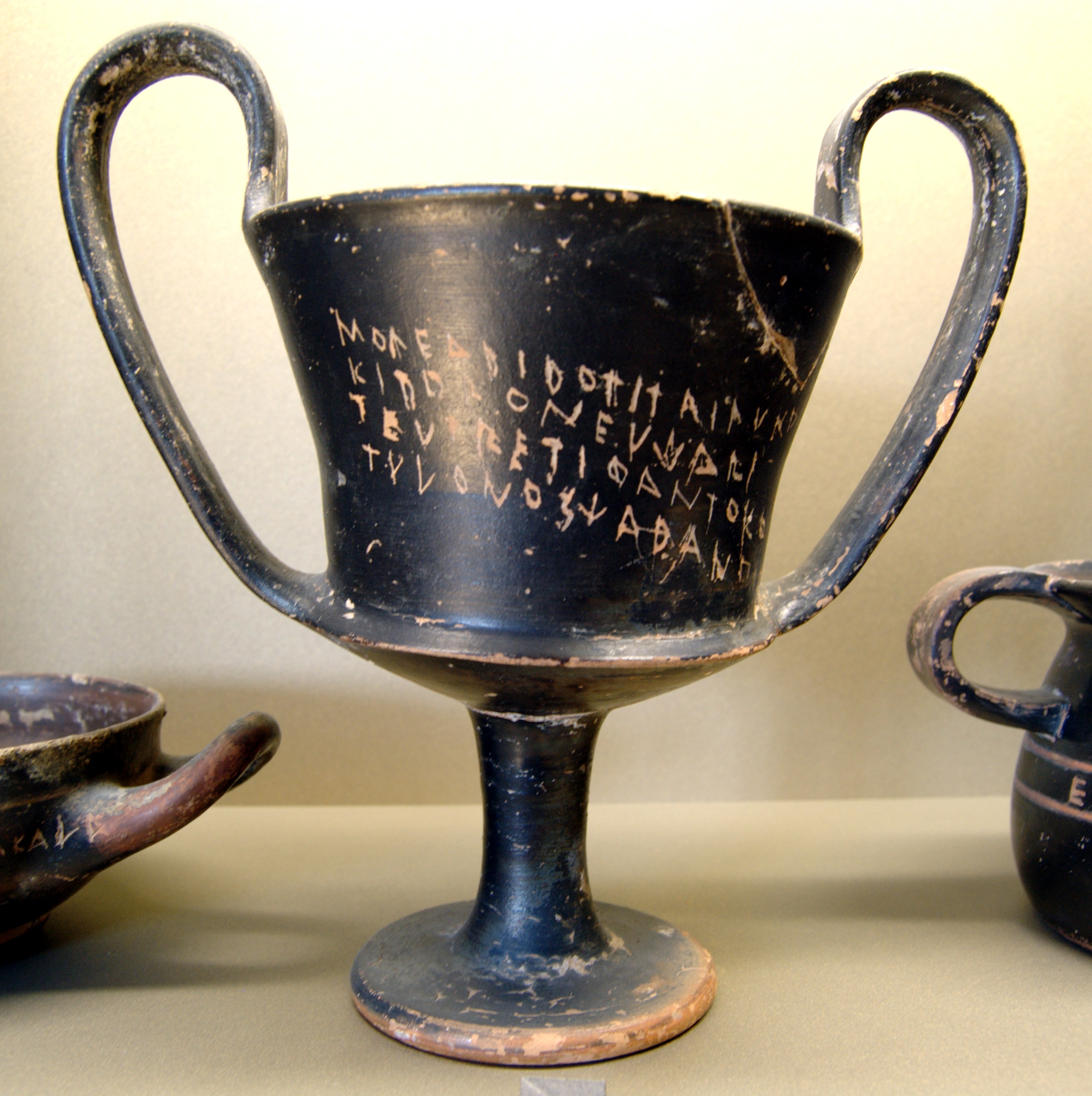
A kantharos from Thespiae (450–425 BC) inscribed in the Boeotian alphabet, Louvre Museum: MNC 670.

In 1882, Greek archaeologist Panagiotis Stamatakis excavated a communal tomb (polyandrion), which was discovered on the road to Leuctra. The tomb contained cremated remains, associated with an in-situ pyre, seven inhumations, and a colossal stone lion. The tomb dates back to the second half of the 5th century BCE. It is usually identified as the tomb of the Thespian soldiers who died at the Battle of Delium in 424 BCE.

== History ==
Several traditions agree that the Boeotians were a people expelled from Thessaly some time after the mythical Trojan War. The people colonized the Boeotian plain over a series of generations, of which the occupation of Thespiae formed a later stage. Other traditions suggest that they were of Mycenean origin.

=== Archaic period ===
According to a Greek philosopher, Thespian nobility was heavily dependent on Thebes during the late seventh century. Wealth in the form of land ownership was concentrated in the hands of a small number of nobles. Most nobility couldn't afford the necessary armor to become an effective force of hoplites. Thespiae therefore decided to become a close ally of Thebes for protection.

The Thespians destroyed Ascra at some point between 700–650 BCE and later settled Eutresis between 600–550 BCE, which signaled the end of their sole reliance on Thebes. It has been speculated that Thespiae took control over Creusis, Siphae, Thisbe and Chorisae sometime in the late sixth century.

The Thessalians invaded Boeotia as far as Thespiae in 571 BCE, more than 200 years before the Battle of Leuctra. This is argued to have given Thespiae the impetus to join the Boeotian League. Historian RJ Buck argues that the Leagues purpose was to protect against Thessalian and other forces. But elsewhere Plutarch gives a date for the Thessalian invasion as shortly preceding the Second Persian War. Herodotus suggests that Thespiae had been a member of the league as long as Thebes had been.

Following the Persian Wars, Thespiae provided two Boeotarchs (military generals) to the league, rather than one; perhaps one for the city and one for the districts under its control. Snodgrass argues that the inclusion of Thisbai, Siphai, and Chorsia in the Thespiae polis provided for two of the eleven districts that provided Boeotian armed forces.

=== Persian, Peloponnesian, and Corinthian wars ===
By the time of the Persian invasion of 480 BCE Thespiae's ability to field a substantial force of hoplites had changed. Thespiae and Thebes were the only Boeotian cities to send a contingent to fight at Thermopylae. Thespiae sent a force of 700 hoplites who remained to fight beside the Spartans on the final day of the battle. Although Thespian hoplites are popularly depicted with dark cloaks and crescent shields, no evidence supports the historical accuracy of these items.

After the battle of Thermopylae, Thebes sided with the Persians and denounced Plataea and Thespiae as the only Boeotian states to ally with the Greeks. The Persian army led by Xerxes I burned down the two cities and the remaining inhabitants furnished a force of 1,800 men for the confederate Greek army that fought at Plataea. During the Athenian invasion of Boeotia in 424 BCE, the Thespian contingent of the Boeotian army sustained heavy losses at the Battle of Delium. In the next year, the Thebans dismantled the walls of Thespiae on the charge that the Thespians were pro-Athenian. It is argued that the dismantling of the walls was perhaps a measure to prevent a democratic revolution.In 414 BCE the Thebans aided the Thespians in suppressing a democratic revolution. The Boeotian League dissolved under Kings Peace in 386 BCE.

In the Corinthian War, Thespiae was initially part of the anti-Spartan alliance. At the Battle of Nemea in 394 BCE, the Thespian contingent fought the Pellenes to a standstill while the rest of the Spartan allies were defeated by the Boeotians. After Nemea, Thespiae became an ally to Sparta and served as staging point for Spartan campaigns in Boeotia throughout the Corinthian War. The city became autonomous as stipulated in the King's Peace of 386 BCE which resolved the Corinthian War and maintained autonomy until 373 BCE. The Boeotian League also dissolved under King's Peace.

=== Hellenistic period ===
In 373 BCE, Thespiae was deprived of independent status and incorporated as an appendage to Thebes. Its citizens were exiled from Boeotia and they arrived in Athens seeking aid. Still, the Thespians sent a contingent to fight against the Spartans at the Battle of Leuctra in 371 BCE. The Boeotarch Epameinondas allowed the Thespians to withdraw before the battle, along with other Boeotians who nursed a grudge against Thebes. Not long after the battle, Thespiae was razed by Thebes and its inhabitants expelled. At some point later the city was restored.

In 335 BCE, the Thespians joined an alliance with Alexander the Great to destroy Thebes. The famous hetaera (courtesan) Phryne was born at Thespiae in the 4th century BCE, though she seems to have lived at Athens. An anecdote by Athenaeus recounts that she offered to finance the rebuilding of the Theban walls on the condition that the words Destroyed by Alexander, Restored by Phryne the courtesan were inscribed upon them.

In the Greek Anthology, it is written that on an altar in Thespiae there was a tripod dedicated to "Zeus the Thunderer" (Ancient Greek: Ἐριβρεμέτῃ). The tripod honored the Thespiae soldiers who went and fought in Asia with Alexander the Great avenge their ancestors.

Thespiae also sought the friendship of the Roman Republic in war against Mithridates VI. As a reward for its support against Mithridates, Pliny referred to Thespiae as a free city within the Roman Empire. Thespiae was also mentioned by Strabo as one of two places (the other being Tanagra) that could be called a city. Thespiae hosted an important group of Roman negotiatores until the refoundation of Corinth in 44 BCE.

Pausanias wrote that Thespians dedicated at Olympia a statue of Pleistaenus (Πλείσταινος), son of the Eurydamus (Εὐρυδάμος), who was the general against the Gauls.

== Notable Thespians ==
- Demophilus of Thespiae: Commander of the Thespian force at the Battle of Thermopylae.
- Phryne: a hetaira. She is best known for her trial for impiety, where she was defended by the orator Hypereides.
- Amphion (Ancient Greek: Ἀμφίων): An ancient writer who wrote about the Temple of the Muses on Mount Helicon.

== Mythology ==
The name "Thespiae" has contesting mythological origins between King Thespius, the city's founder, and Thespia, a Naiad-nymph, abducted by Apollo. The city of Thespiae bore importance in numerous myths such as the tale of Narcissus, a Thespian youth who, after gazing upon his reflection in a pool, fell in love with himself, leading to his demise.

The city of Thespiae also appeared within the myth of Hercules. The city was plagued by the Lion of Cithaeron who was destroying the flocks. King Thespius promised to reward Hercules a night with each of his fifty daughters if he could subdue the lion. When he successfully completed his mission, Hercules was granted a night with each of the fifty daughters of King Thespius.

Another Thespian myth involves a dragon which plagued the city. Zeus decided a youth would be picked at random to be sacrificed to the dragon each year. But when the youth Cleostratus was picked, his lover Menestratus sacrificed himself to save him and destroyed the dragon by wearing a spiked breastplate which slayed the beast as it swallowed him.

The myth surrounding Mount Helicon included the nine Muses. During a musical contest, the Muses performed a song that inspired Mount Helicon to rise toward the heavens. Poseidon advised Pegasus to stop its ascent by kicking it with its hoof which created the sacred spring Hippocrene.

== Ancient religion ==
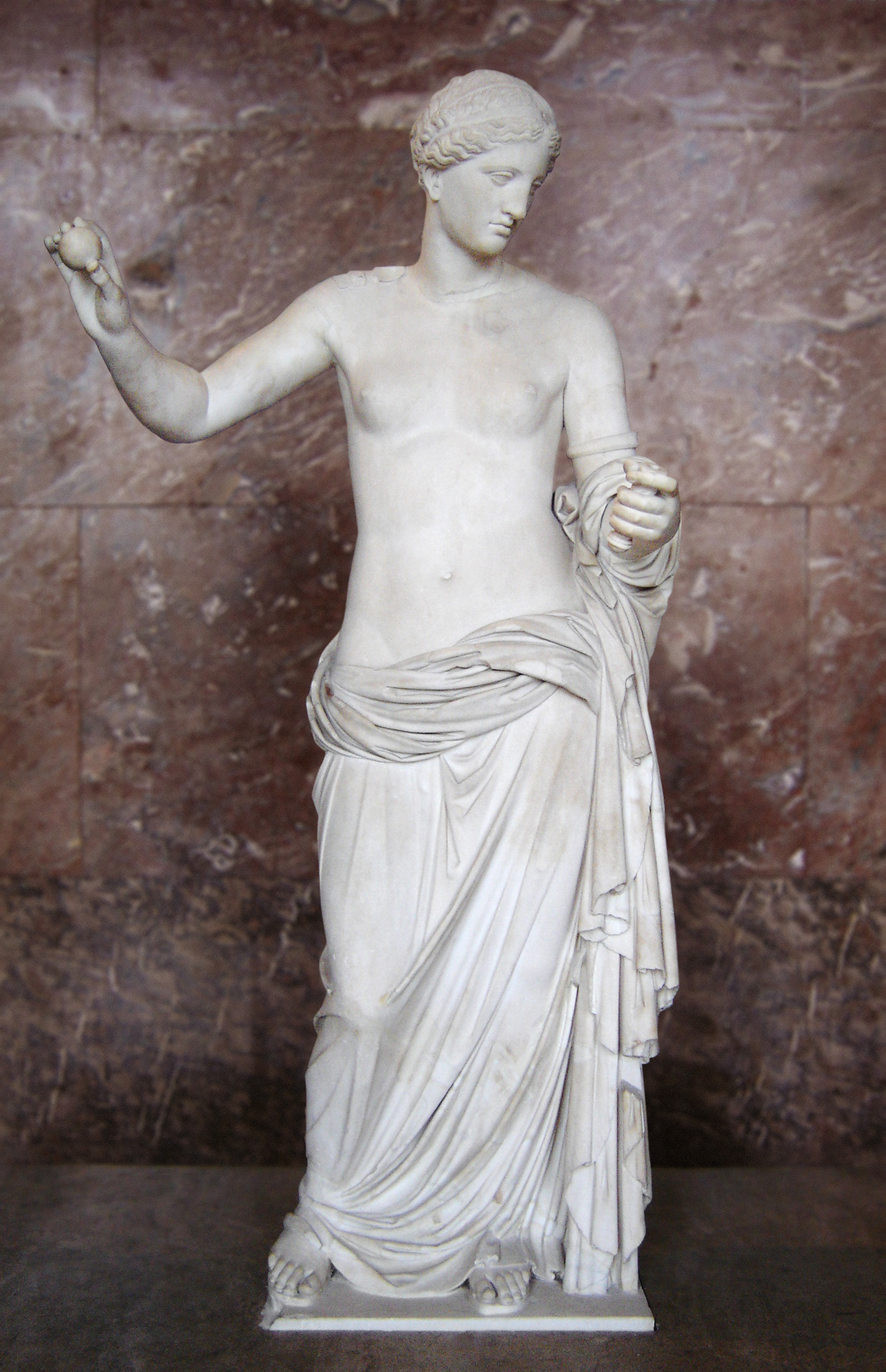
The Venus of Arles, modeled after the Aphrodite of Thespiae by Praxiteles, Louvre Museum: Ma 439 (MR 365)

According to Pausanias, the deity most worshipped at Thespiae was Eros. Sculptors honored Eros in their art. Praxiteles created Eros of Thespiae out of Parian marble and later, Lysippos crafted an Eros out of bronze. Praxiteles' statue attracted the attention of the Romans. It was carried off to Rome by Caligula, restored to Thespiae by Claudius, and again claimed by Roman emperor Nero.

Another work by Praxiteles was Aphrodite of Thespiae, after which the Venus of Arles is thought to have been modeled. Clement of Alexandria writes that at Thespiae there was a statue of the Cithaeronian Hera.

Thespians also worshipped the nine Muses. At the Temple of the Muses in Helicon, boys would dance as part of honoring the deities. Noting the appearance of the Muses at Athens, Sparta, Corinth, and other Greek states, a source concludes that the Thespians and other Boeotians spread the value of the Muses to other parts of Greece.

The Muses were honored by a shrine in the Valley of the Muses and celebrated in a festival in the sacred grove on Mount Helicon. During the festival, men would celebrate and compete in music and athletic games in honor of Eros. Another festival celebrated by Thespians was the Erotidia (Ancient Greek: Ἐρωτίδεια) meaning festivals of Eros. It was held every five years.

== See also ==
- List of ancient Greek cities
