= Automedusa =

Greek mythological character

In Greek mythology, Automedusa (Ancient Greek: Αὐτομεδούση or Αὐτομέδουσα) was a Megarian princess as the daughter of King Alcathous either by his first wife, Pyrgo or second spouse, Evaechme, daughter of King Megareus of Megara. Thus, she was the sister of Ischepolis, Callipolis, Iphinoe and Periboea. Automedusa married Heracles's half-brother Iphicles and had by him a son Iolaus, who became the charioteer of Heracles.
