= Pyrrha (mythology) =

Any of three figures in Greek mythology

In Greek mythology, Pyrrha (/ˈpɪrə/; Ancient Greek: Πύῤῥα, romanized: Pýrrha) may refer to the following women:

- Pyrrha, wife of Deucalion.
- Pyrrha, a Theban princess as the younger daughter of King Creon probably by his wife Eurydice or Henioche. Besides her older sister Megara, Pyrrha has three brothers with the names: Menoeceus (Megareus), Lycomedes and Haemon. She was married by her father to Iphicles, the son of Amphitryon, who was previously wedded to Automedusa, daughter of Alcathous. By Iphicles, Pyrrha became the mother of two unknown children who were later thrown into the fire by Heracles during the hero's fit of madness. Together with her sister, Henioche, they erected statues for them near the temple of Ismenian Apollo in Thebes.
- Pyrrha, possibly the name used by Achilles while hiding as a maid among the daughters of King Lycomedes of Skyros.
