= Megareus =

In Greek mythology, Megareus (Ancient Greek: Μεγαρεύς) may refer to:

- Megareus, king of Onchestus in Boeotia and father of Hippomenes.
- Megareus, son of Eurydice of Thebes, and a defender of Thebes during the war of the Seven against Thebes.
