= Sufax =

Berber and Greek mythological figure

- Founder of Tangier
- Member of the Libyan Royal Family; Progenitor of the Numidian dynasty
- Other names: Sophax, Syphax, Sufaqs
- Abode: Libya
- Parents: Heracles and Tinjis

Sufax, Syphax, Sufaqs or Sophax (Ancient Greek: Σόφαξ) was a hero in Berber and Greek mythology.

== Family ==
According to the myth, Sufax was the son of goddess Tinjis from her second marriage to the hero Heracles, and the grandson of Zeus and mortal Alcmene. His half-sister was likely Iphinoe, and his half-brother (and possible half-nephew) was Palaemon, son of Iphinoe and Heracles.

== Mythology ==
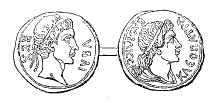
Images of King Juba II and Queen Cleopatra Selene II. Juba believed he was a descendant of Sufax.

Sufax replaced his mother's first husband Antaeus as a guard of the country of the Berbers (or Imazighen). He is said to be the founder of Tangier in memory to his mother.

According to the Berber mythology, many of the Berber kings are descendants of Sufax, who defended their lands. He had a son, Diodorus, who reigned over many North African Berber tribes with the help of the Olympians. According to the ancient Greek historian Plutarch, many of the myths were created in order to give credits to the Numidian king Juba II who considered himself a descendant of Diodorus and Hercules.
