= Abrota =

Ancient Greek mythological queen

In Greek mythology, Abrota, Abróte, or Habrotê (Ancient Greek: Ἀβρώτη/Ἁβρώτη) was the daughter of eponymous King Onchestοs of the Boeotian city of Onchestos and sister of Megareus. Nisos, the king of Megara in the time of his reign married her and the supposed mother of his daughters, Scylla, Iphinoe and Eurynome_{.}

== Mythology ==
On the death of his beloved wife, Abrota, Nisos commanded all the Megarian women to wear a garment of the same kind as Abrota had worn, which was called aphábroma (ἀφάβρωμα) and was still in use in the time of Plutarch.

When Nisus, from whom Nisaea acquired its name, was king, he took a wife from Boeotia, Habrotê, daughter of Onchestus, the sister of Megareus, a woman who, as it appears, was both exceptionally intelligent and remarkably discreet. When she died, the Megarians mourned her with one accord, and Nisus, wishing that her memory and her repute should be established everlastingly, ordered the women of the city to wear the garment that she used to wear; and because of her he called the garment aphabroma. Even the god seems to have furthered the repute of this woman, for often, when the Megarian women wished to make a change in their raiment, he prevented them by an oracle.

== See also ==
- Bell, Robert E., Women of Classical Mythology: A Biographical Dictionary. ABC-Clio. 1991. ISBN 9780874365818, 0874365813.
- Gaius Julius Hyginus, Fabulae from The Myths of Hyginus translated and edited by Mary Grant. University of Kansas Publications in Humanistic Studies. Online version at the Topos Text Project.
- Hesiod, Catalogue of Women from Homeric Hymns, Epic Cycle, Homerica translated by Evelyn-White, H G. Loeb Classical Library Volume 57. London: William Heinemann, 1914. Online version at theoi.com
- Lucius Mestrius Plutarchus, Moralia with an English Translation by Frank Cole Babbitt. Cambridge, MA. Harvard University Press. London. William Heinemann Ltd. 1936. Online version at the Perseus Digital Library. Greek text available from the same website.
- Pausanias, Description of Greece with an English Translation by W.H.S. Jones, Litt.D., and H.A. Ormerod, M.A., in 4 Volumes. Cambridge, MA, Harvard University Press; London, William Heinemann Ltd. 1918. ISBN 0-674-99328-4. Online version at the Perseus Digital Library
- Pausanias, Graeciae Descriptio. 3 vols. Leipzig, Teubner. 1903. Greek text available at the Perseus Digital Library.
