= Pyrgo (mythology) =

In Greek mythology, Pyrgo (Ancient Greek: Πυργώ) was the first wife of the Pisatian prince Alcathous, son of King Pelops of Pisa and Hippodamia, daughter of Oenomaus. She may be the mother of some or all of Alcathous children: Ischepolis, Callipolis, Iphinoe and Periboea. Otherwise, they were by Alcathous' second wife, Euaechme, daughter of King Megareus of Megara.
