= Autonoë =

In Greek mythology, Autonoë (/ɔːˈtɒnoʊ.iː/; Ancient Greek: Αὐτονόη, romanized: Autonoê, lit. 'thinking for oneself' or 'self-minded') may refer to the following personages:

- Autonoë, one of the 50 Nereids, sea-nymph daughters of the 'Old Man of the Sea' Nereus and the Oceanid Doris. Her name means 'giver of inspiration'.
- Autonoë, one of the Danaïdes, daughter of Danaus and Polyxo.
- Autonoë, was one of the daughters of Cadmus and Harmonia
- Autonoë, daughter of Pireus and mother of Palaemon by Heracles. Otherwise, the mother of Palaemon was called Iphinoe, daughter of Antaeus.
- Autonoë, one of Penelope's maids.
