= Iphicles =

Hero in Greek mythology

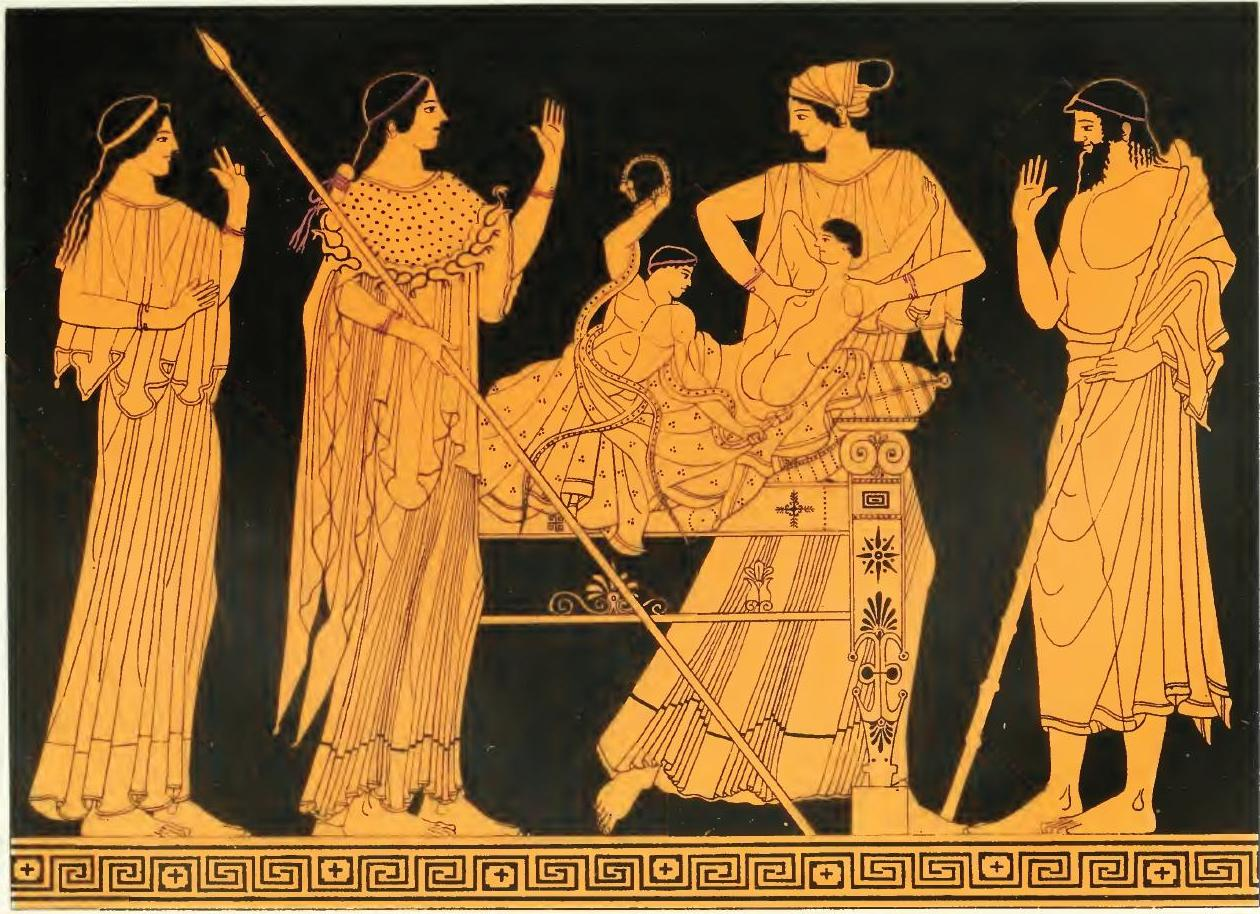
Iphicles and his half-brother Heracles as infants on a red-figure vase.

In Greek mythology, Iphicles (/ˈɪfɪˌkliːz/ or /ˈaɪfɪˌkliːz/; Ancient Greek: Ἰφικλῆς Iphiklēs), also called Iphiclus, was the maternal half-twin brother of Heracles and one of the Calydonian boar hunters.

== Family ==
Iphicles was the son of Alcmene and her human husband Amphitryon, whereas Heracles was her son by Zeus. He also had a sister, Laonome, who married Euphemus or Polyphemus. Iphicles was the father of Heracles' charioteer Iolaus by his first wife, Automedusa, daughter of Alcathous. Afterwards, he fathered two children by Pyrrha, the younger daughter of Creon.

== Mythology ==
Iphicles was one night younger than his half-brother Heracles, who strangled the snakes which had been sent by Hera or by Amphitryon, and at which Iphicles was frightened. Iphicles grew into a strong man but could not match his famous brother. When Heracles was made insane once again by Hera, the hero threw into the fire his brother's two offspring by Pyrrha, who perished as a result.

Nevertheless, Iphicles went with Heracles on a punitive expedition against Troy, because King Laomedon refused to give Heracles the mares he had promised him before. Arriving in Troy, Iphicles and Telamon were sent by Heracles to the city to claim the mares, but they were thrown into prison by Laomedon. But Priam, the son of the king, disagreed with the decision of his father, sent two swords to the two heroes, and revealed the plans that Laomedon had for Heracles. As soon as Iphicles and Telamon heard this they killed their guards with the swords and returned to Heracles for the plans of Laomedon to be revealed. Then Heracles and his men went to the king and eventually slew him.

When Heracles ended his twelve labours, King Eurystheus accused him of killing him from the throne, and ordered that he, together with Alcmene and Iphicles, leave Tiryns. This is how Iphicles ended up in Arcadia where he joined Heracles on a punitive expedition against Hippocoon of Sparta. In the ensuing battle, Iphicles was killed and Heracles was inconsolable over the death of his half-brother, and voluntarily went into exile to another city.

In some accounts, Iphicles fought in the first battle of Heracles against the Eleans and Augeas, and was wounded by the Molionides of Elis. In a fainting condition, Iphicles was carried by his relatives to Pheneus, home of his grandmother Laonome, where he was carefully nursed by Buphagus, a citizen of Pheneus, and by his wife Promne. They buried him when he died of his wound and was honoured with a heroum.
