= Iphiclus (mythology) =

Several figures in Greek mythology

In Greek mythology, Iphiclus (/ˈɪfɪkləs/; Ancient Greek: Ἴφικλος, romanized: Iphiklos) was the name of the following figures:

- Iphiclus, other name for Iphicles, son of Alcmene and Amphitryon.
- Iphiclus, a Pleuronian prince as the son of King Thestius and either Laophonte, Leucippe, Deidameia or Eurythemis. He was the brother of Althaea, Leda, Hypermnestra, Evippus, Plexippus and Eurypylus. Iphitus was one of the Argonauts, and a participant in the hunt for the Calydonian Boar, where he was killed by Meleager.
- Iphiclus, a Phylacean prince as the son of the eponymous King Phylacus of Phylace and Clymene, and brother of Alcimede and Clymenus. He was the father of Protesilaus and Podarces by Diomedeia. Hesiod described him as fleet of foot. Iphiclus was cured of infertility by Melampus, and gave him his famous herd of oxen in reward. He was counted among the Argonauts who sailed for Colchis in their quest of the Golden Fleece.
- Iphiclus, a Cretan prince as the son of King Idomeneus and Meda, probably the brother of Orsilochus, Cleisithyra and Lycus. Together with the latter, they were slain by the usurper Leucus.
