= Scylla (daughter of Nisus) =

Greek mythological figure, daughter of Nisos

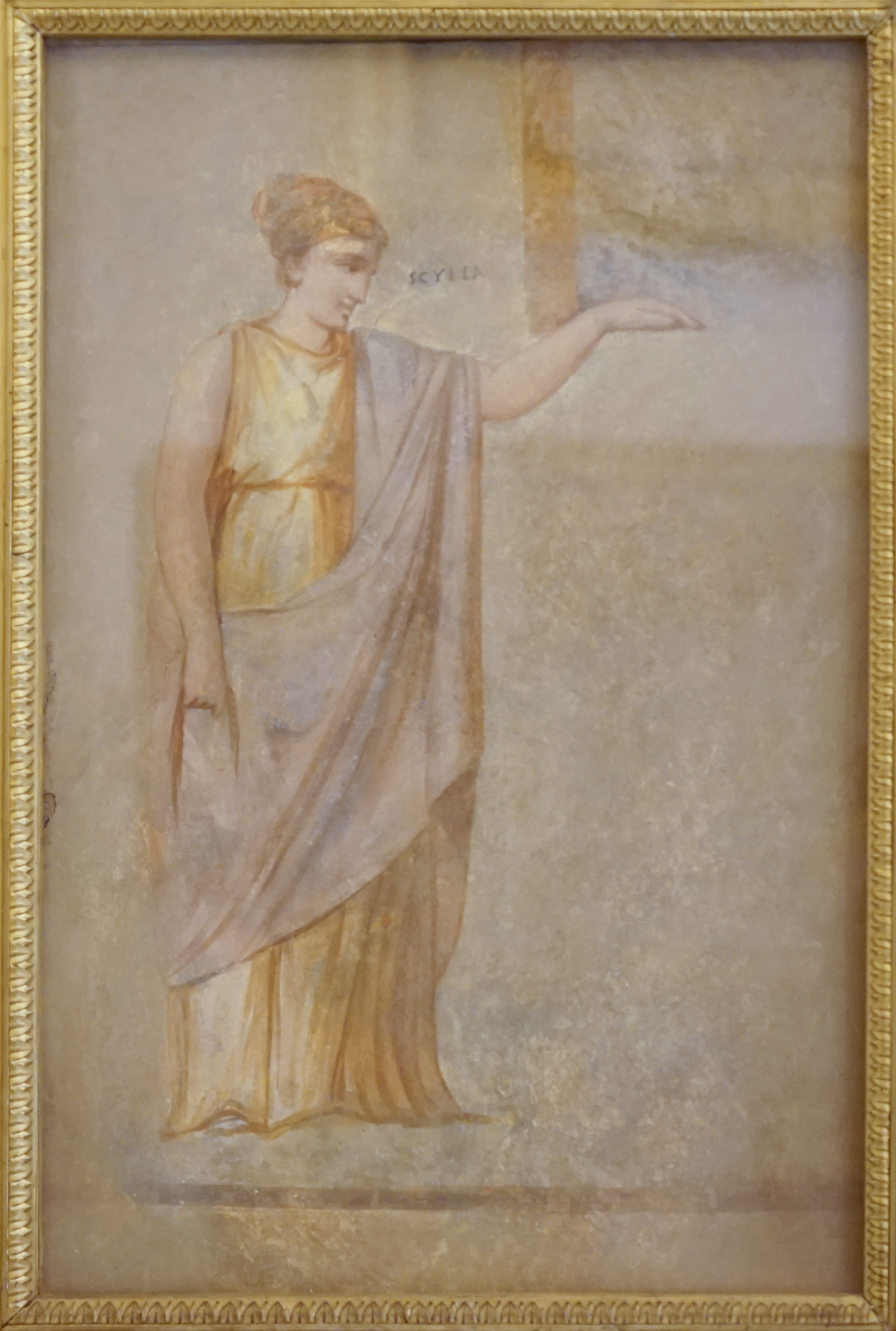
Scylla on a Roman fresco from a villa at Tor Marancia, Rome.

In Greek mythology, Scylla (/ˈsɪlə/ SIL-ə; Ancient Greek: Σκύλλα, romanized: Skýlla, pronounced [skýlːa]) was a princess of Megara as daughter of King Nisus.

== Family ==
Scylla's mother was possibly Abrota, daughter of King Onchestus. She was the sister to Eurynome and Iphinoe.

== Mythology ==
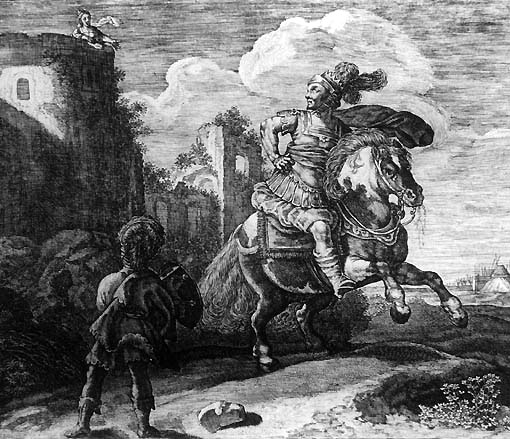
17th-century engraving of Scylla falling in love with Minos.

As the story goes, Nisus possessed a single lock of purple hair which granted him and the city invincibility. When Minos, the King of Crete, invaded Nisus's kingdom, Scylla saw him from the city's battlements and fell in love with him. In order to win Minos's heart, she decided that she would grant him victory in battle by removing the lock from her father's head and presented it to Minos. Disgusted with her lack of filial devotion, Minos left her in the sacked ruins of Megara. In some versions Scylla pursued the departing enemy; in others he bound her to the prow of his ship. Before drowning, Scylla was transformed into a seabird (ciris, perhaps an egret), relentlessly pursued by her father, who was transformed into a sea eagle (haliaeetus).

Scylla's story is a close parallel to that of Comaetho, daughter of Pterelaus. Similar stories were told of Pisidice (princess of Methymna) and of Leucophrye. The story of al-Nadirah told by al-Tabari and early Islamic writers are considered by Theodor Nöldeke to be derived from the tale of Scylla.

Scylla appears in Alexander Pope's mock-heroic "Rape of the Lock" as part of an extended representation of gallant chatter round a card table in the guise of a heroic battle:

Ah cease, rash youth! desist ere 'tis too late,
Fear the just gods, and think of Scylla's fate!
Chang'd to a bird, and sent to flit in air,
She dearly pays for Nisus' injur'd hair!
