= Boedromia =

Athenian festival in honor of Apollo

The Boedromia (Ancient Greek: Βοηδρόμια) was an ancient Greek festival held at Athens on the 7th of Boedromion (summer) in the honor of Apollo Boedromios (the helper in distress). Though Apollo was referred to as Boedromios by the Boeotians as well as other Greeks, the festival was exclusively celebrated by the Athenians. According to Demosthenes, the only classical writer to refer to the festival, it had a military connotation, and thanks the god for his assistance to the Athenians during wars. It could also commemorate a specific intervention at the origin of the festival. Various ancient sources have offered differing accounts on what this intervention may have been. According to Plutarch, Theseus refused to battle against the Amazons until he had sacrificed to Phobos. It is in recognition of the help granted in the ensuing battle that the Athenians celebrate the festival. However, the Suda and Euripides report that the festival's origins lie in the help either Xuthos or his son Ion granted to the Athenians when they were attacked by Eumolpos during the reign of Erechtheus. During the event, sacrifices were also made to Artemis Agrotera.

== See also ==
- Athenian festivals

== Sources ==
Dictionary of Greek and Roman Antiquities edited by William Smith (1870) p.204
