= Leucophryne =

Greek mythological figure

In Greek mythology, Leucophryne (Ancient Greek: Λευκοφρύνη, romanized: Leukophrýne, lit. 'white toad') was the daughter of Mandrolytus, a resident (possibly the ruler) of a city in Asia Minor.

== Mythology ==
Leucippus, son of Xanthius, was chosen by the oracle as leader of a colony, one of ten sent out of Pherae by Admetus (sending out such colonies was a common practice to avoid overpopulation). In search for a new place to settle, he was involved in a military conflict with the native city of Mandrolytus, and besieged it. Leucophryne fell in love with Leucippus and betrayed the city to him. It is not known whether Leucippus answered her feelings and what her further destiny was. Leucophryne's story is similar to those of Comaetho, Scylla (princess) and Pisidice of Methymna, all of which ended tragically for the heroines.
