= Leucus =

Greek mythological characters

In Greek mythology, the name Leucus or Leukos (Ancient Greek: Λεῦκος "white") may refer to:

- Leucus, son of the bronze giant Talos of Crete and foster son of King Idomeneus. Following the advice of Nauplius, he seduced Meda, wife of Idomeneus, who had been convinced by Nauplius not to stay faithful to her husband, when Idomeneus himself had gone to Trojan War. Leucus eventually killed Meda and took possession of the kingdom; he also killed her daughter Cleisithyra, despite the fact that she was betrothed to him by Idomeneus, and two sons of Meda, Iphiclus and Lycus (or Leucus). Idomeneus was driven out of Crete by Leucus upon return from Troy.
- Leucus, a companion of Odysseus, killed by Antiphus. According to Photius, he was originally from Zacynthos and is the namesake of the island of Leucade. He also raised the temple of Apollo Leukates.
- Leucus, a singer from Lesbos in the army of Dionysus.
- Leucus, an epithet of Hermes in Boeotia.

== See also ==
- 11351 Leucus, a Trojan asteroid
