= Pisidice of Methymna =

Methymnian princess in Greek mythology

In Greek mythology, Pisidice (/paɪˈsɪdɪsiː/ py-SEE-dee-see; Ancient Greek: Πεισιδίκη, romanized: Peisidíkē) is a native of Methymna, an ancient Greek city state in the north of the island of Lesbos in the northeastern Aegean Sea. Pisidice is notable for her love for the hero Achilles who waged war against her homeland. Pisidice's infatuation with him was so great that she willingly betrayed her home city for his sake on the promise Achilles would marry her, but after conquering Methymna the hero put her to death for treason.

Her story has many shared elements with other heroines who betrayed their besieged fatherlands after falling in love with the enemy, only for their supposed lovers to punish them accordingly for treachery, while at the same time reaping the benefits of the women's treason. It also seems to be part of an old but obscure tradition of Achilles raiding and capturing the cities of the northeastern Aegean.

== Etymology ==
Pisidice's name is a compound word, made up of the Ancient Greek words πείθω (peíthō) meaning "to persuade, to convince", and δίκη (díkē) meaning "custom" or "justice".

== Family ==
The princess Pisidice was a native of Methymna, daughter of the unnamed king and queen of Methymna. It is possible that Pisidice's father is the old Lepetymnus, which is also mentioned in the poem, although the text is too vague. Lepetymnus' wife was Methymna, daughter of king Macareus of Lesbos and nameshake of the town.

== Mythology ==
At some point during the course of the Trojan War, the Phthian hero Achilles raided the islands along the western coast of Asia Minor. Eventually he attacked the island of Lesbos too and plundered many of its cities after besieging them. At long last he laid a siege against Methymna as well, which held out valiantly for some time. Pisidice took a glimpse of him from the walls, and Aphrodite made her immediately fall in love with Achilles. The more she watched him fight gallantly, the deeper her love grew. Eventually she sent out her slave nurse to meet him and relay her terms to him, promising to Achilles to deliver the city to him on the condition he would make her his wife. Achilles accepted gladly.

So Pisidice foolishly brought Achilles' host right into Methymna after stealthily unbarring the city gates, which resulted in the city's fall and sack. She witnessed her aged parents being put to the sword and women being led away to slavery, while expecting to be rewarded for her good services with marriage to Achilles. But while Achilles was pleased to see Methymna fall after accepting Pisidice's help, he nevertheless felt disgust for the girl who sold out her own countrymen, so he broke his oath to her and had his garrison stone Pisidice to death as punishment for her treason.

In a very similar tale found in ancient scholia, Achilles wanted to sack the city of Monenia on the Asiatic mainland, but despaired due to the strong defences of the city. He was about to give up when a maiden, who had fallen in love with him, threw an apple to him with an engraved message encouraging Achilles not to give up because the city was suffering terribly from water shortage and they would surrender soon. So he stayed and in the end took Monenia very easily, and although there is no mention of the girl's fate afterwards, Achilles renamed Monenia to Pedasus or Pedasa after her.

== Interpretation ==
=== Origins ===
Pisidice's treason and subsequent death sentence was a subject of the Hellenistic poem The Founding of Lesbos, which Parthenius of Nicaea quoted and used as a source in his work Love Romances. Although Parthenius does not mention the poem's authorship, it is generally attributed to Apollonius Rhodius by modern scholars, though this assertion has not been unchallenged. Apollonius drew heavily from the older Homeric, Hesiodic and cyclic traditions for the writing of the Founding of Lesbos, particularly the motif of a young girl who betrays her land out of love for the conqueror. Moreover, he also parallelised Pisidice helping out the hero at the cost of her family and native land with another of his works, the Hellenistic Argonautica, in which the lovestruck Medea does the same for Jason, only to be betrayed by him in the end.

=== Connections and parallels ===
Pisidice and Achilles fit a pattern of tragic love stories where a young maiden falls in love with a great warrior attacking her homeland, and betrays (or rarely, saves) said homeland to him with the prospect of marriage. But instead of marrying her, after her lover has profitted from her condemnable actions he denounces her as a traitor and has her executed for treason. This pattern is also seen in the myths of Scylla with Minos, Comaetho with Amphitryon, and Leucippus with Leucophryne.

The story of Pisidice, and particularly the variation of the story that takes place in Asia Minor, seems to be part of an old Aeolic epic tradition about Achilles raiding Anatolian and Aegean cities, a tradition whose traces can be seen as early as the epic poems Iliad and the lost Cypria. Both poems relate stories of city-sacking Achilles besieging cities like Lyrnessus, Pedasus–from which his primary concubine Briseis is also attained– and others including Lesbos itself, juxtaposed with his and the other Achaeans' inability to take Troy.

Although Homer identifies Briseis' home as Lyrnessus, in other authors it is Pedasus instead. Both she and Pisidice have their homelands sacked by the hero, their kin killed at his hands, and have visions about their marriage to Achilles. All those city-sacking narratives from this tradition seem to follow more or less the same pattern where a city is captured (sometimes with the help of a maiden who falls in love with Achilles), the male soldiers are put to death, and the women are taken as slaves, so it is possible that Briseis herself might have originated from a pattern of such stories, although the Iliad clearly does not incorporate romantic elements in its narrative about his raid of Briseis' homeland.

== See also ==
Other women who betray their people to help a strange man they have fallen in love with include:

- Ariadne
- Scylla
- Medea
- Leucophryne

== Bibliography ==
- Bell, Robert E. (1991). Women of Classical Mythology: A Biographical Dictionary. ABC-Clio. ISBN 9780874365818.
- Campbell, Malcolm (1994). A Commentary on Apollonius Rhodius Argonautica III 1-471. Leiden, the Netherlands: BRILL. ISBN 90-04-10158-6.
- Cuypers, Martijn (2002). "Ptoliporthos Akhilleus. The Sack of Methymna in the "Lesbou Ktisis"". Hermathena (173/174). Trinity College Dublin: 117–135. JSTOR 23041741.
- D Scholia to the Iliad (Mythological Narratives (historiai), translated by R. Scott Smith et al. as Mythical Stories in the D Scholia to Homer’s Iliad , nobly published online in 2023 at Manto-Myth.org/Canopos under a Creative Commons Attribution 4.0 License (CC-BY). 2014 edition of the Greek text by Helmut van Thiel. Available online at Topos Text.
- Dué, Casey (2002). Homeric Variations on a Lament by Briseis. MD, USA: Rowman & Littlefield publishers, Inc. ISBN 0-7425-2219-9.
- Eustathius, Eustathii, archiepiscopi thessalonicensis: commentarii ad Homeri Iliadem, Volume 2, J. A. G. Weigel, 1828. Book available online at Google Books.
- Fortenbaugh, William W.; Schütrumpf, Eckart (2000). Demetrius of Phalerum: Text, Translation and Discussion. Routledge. ISBN 978-0-7658-0017-6.
- Grimal, Pierre (1987). The Dictionary of Classical Mythology. Wiley-Blackwell. ISBN 0-631-13209-0.
- Homer, The Iliad with an English Translation by A.T. Murray, Ph.D. in two volumes. Cambridge, MA., Harvard University Press; London, William Heinemann, Ltd. 1924. Online text available online at Perseus Digital Library.
- Käppel, Lutz (October 1, 2006). "Peisidice". In Cancik, Hubert; Schneider, Helmuth (eds.). Brill's New Pauly. Kiel: Brill Reference On line. doi:10.1163/1574-9347_bnp_e912120. ISSN 1574-9347.
- Kay, N. M. (November 6, 2013). Epigrams from the Anthologia Latina: Text,Translation and Commentary. Bloomsbury Publishing. ISBN 978-1-8496-6783-8.
- March, Jennifer R. (May 31, 2014). Dictionary of Classical Mythology. Oxbow Books. ISBN 978-1-78297-635-6.
- Liddell, Henry George; Scott, Robert (1940). A Greek-English Lexicon, revised and augmented throughout by Sir Henry Stuart Jones with the assistance of Roderick McKenzie. Oxford: Clarendon Press. Online version at Perseus.tufts project.
- Parthenius, Love Romances translated by Sir Stephen Gaselee (1882–1943), S. Loeb Classical Library Volume 69. Cambridge, MA. Harvard University Press. 1916. Online version at the Topos Text Project.
- Sistakou, Evina (2017). "Apollonius Rhodius: Fragments". In Sider, David (ed.). Hellenistic Poetry: A Selection. US: University of Michigan Press. ISBN 9780472053131.
- Sistakou, Evina (November 15, 2008). "In Search of Apollonius' Ktisis Poems". In Papanghelis, Theodore; Rangakos, Antonios (eds.). Brill's Companion to Apollonius Rhodius (2nd, revised ed.). Leiden, the Netherlands: BRILL. ISBN 978-90-04-16185-6.
- Smith, William (1873). A Dictionary of Greek and Roman Biography and Mythology. London, UK: John Murray, printed by Spottiswoode and Co. Online version at the Perseus.tufts library.
