= Evippus =

Series of the same name characters in ancient Greek mythology

In Greek mythology, the name Evippus or Euippos (Ancient Greek: Εὔιππος, meaning "having good horses") may refer to:

- Evippus, a Pleuronian prince as the son of King Thestius and Eurythemis, daughter of Cleoboea. He was the brother of Althaea, Leda, Hypermnestra, Iphiclus, Plexippus and Eurypylus. Evippus might have been killed by his nephew Meleager during the war of the Curetes and the Calydonians.
- Evippus, a Lycian who was killed by Patroclus in the Trojan War.
- Evippus, a son of Megareus and Iphinoe, brother of Timalcus and Euaechme. He was killed by the Cithaeronian lion.
- Evippus, an Arcadian hero. On the wedding day of Adrastus' daughters, his shield fell off the highest summit of the temple of Athena, which was a sign of bad luck in the future.
