= Megarus =

In Greek mythology, Megarus (Ancient Greek: Μέγαρος) may refer to two personages who were credited to be eponyms of Megara:

- Megarus, a son of Zeus, by one of the Sithnides, the nymphs native of Megara. He escaped the flood in the time of Deucalion, by making his way to the heights of Gerania. The mountain had not yet received this name, but was then named Gerania (Crane Hill) because cranes were flying and Megarus swam towards the cry of the birds.
- Megarus, another name of Megareus, the man who aid King Nisus of Megara against his war with King Minos of Crete.
