= 11351 Leucus =

Mid-sized asteroid sharing Jupiter's orbit

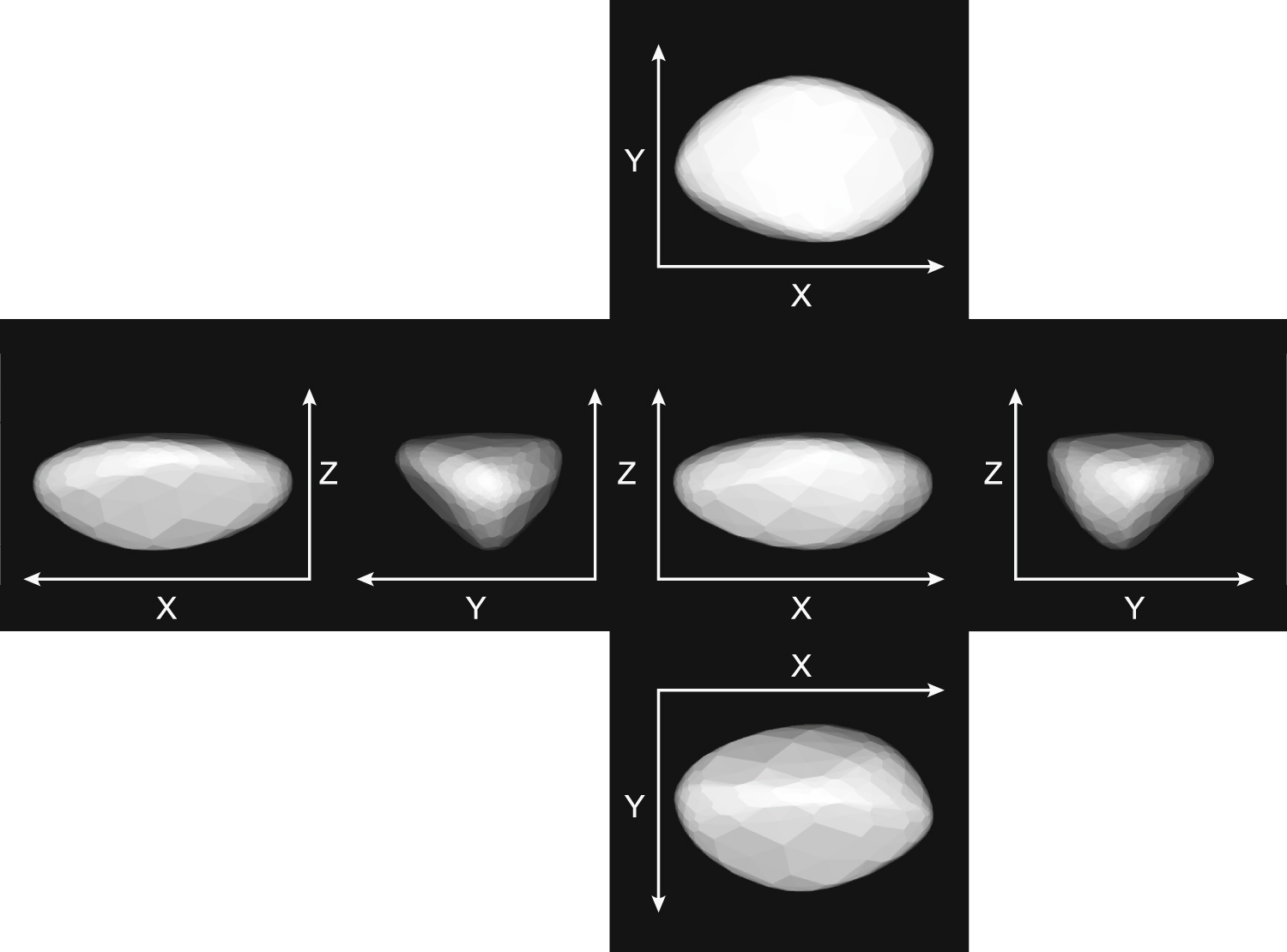
- Shape model of Leucus viewed from multiple orthogonal perspectives

Discovery
- Discovered by: SCAP
- Discovery site: Beijing Xinglong Obs.
- Discovery date: 12 October 1997

Designations
- Pronunciation: /ˈljuːkəs/
- Named after: Leucus (Greek mythology)
- Alternative designations: 1997 TS_{25} · 1996 VP_{39}
- Minor planet category: Jupiter trojan Greek · background

Orbital characteristics
- Epoch 25 February 2023 (JD 2460000.5)
- Uncertainty parameter 0
- Earliest precovery date: 25 July 1982
- Aphelion: 5.652 AU
- Perihelion: 4.953 AU
- Semi-major axis: 5.302 AU
- Eccentricity: 0.0659
- Orbital period (sidereal): 12.21 yr (4,460 d)
- Mean anomaly: 43.784°
- Mean motion: 0° 4^{m} 50.607^{s} / day
- Inclination: 11.546°
- Longitude of ascending node: 251.087°
- Argument of perihelion: 160.955°
- Jupiter MOID: 0.0942 AU
- T_{Jupiter}: 2.955

Physical characteristics
- Dimensions: 60.8 × 39.2 × 27.8 km
- Mean diameter: 41±0.7 km (surface equivalent)
- Synodic rotation period: 445.683±0.007 h
- Axial tilt: 13° (wrt ecliptic); 10° (wrt orbit)
- Pole ecliptic longitude: 208°
- Pole ecliptic latitude: +77°
- Geometric albedo: 0.043±0.002
- Spectral type: D B–V = 0.739±0.044; V–R = 0.498±0.044; V–I = 0.900±0.057
- Absolute magnitude (H): 10.979±0.037

11351 Leucus /ˈljuːkəs/ is a mid-sized Jupiter trojan from the Greek camp, approximately 40 kilometers (25 miles) in diameter. It is a target of the Lucy mission, scheduled for a flyby in April 2028. The assumed D-type asteroid is an exceptionally slow rotator with a rotation period of 466 hours. It was discovered on 12 October 1997 by the Beijing Schmidt CCD Asteroid Program (SCAP) at Xinglong Station in the Chinese province of Hebei, and later named after the Achaean warrior Leucus from Greek mythology.

== Orbit and classification ==
Leucus is a dark Jupiter trojan asteroid in a 1:1 orbital resonance with Jupiter. It is located in the leading Greek camp at Jupiter's L_{4} Lagrangian point, 60° ahead of its orbit. It is also a non-family asteroid in the Jovian background population.

It orbits the Sun at a distance of 5.0–5.6 AU once every 12 years and 2 months (4,440 days; semi-major axis of 5.29 AU). Its orbit has an eccentricity of 0.06 and an inclination of 12° with respect to the ecliptic. The body's observation arc begins with a precovery taken at the Siding Spring Observatory in July 1982, more than 15 years prior to its official discovery observation at Xinglong.

== Exploration ==
=== Lucy mission target ===
Leucus is planned to be visited by the Lucy spacecraft, which launched in 2021. The flyby is scheduled for 18 April 2028, and will approach the asteroid to a distance of 1,000 km (620 mi) at a relative velocity of 5.9 km/s (13,000 mph).

== Physical characteristics ==
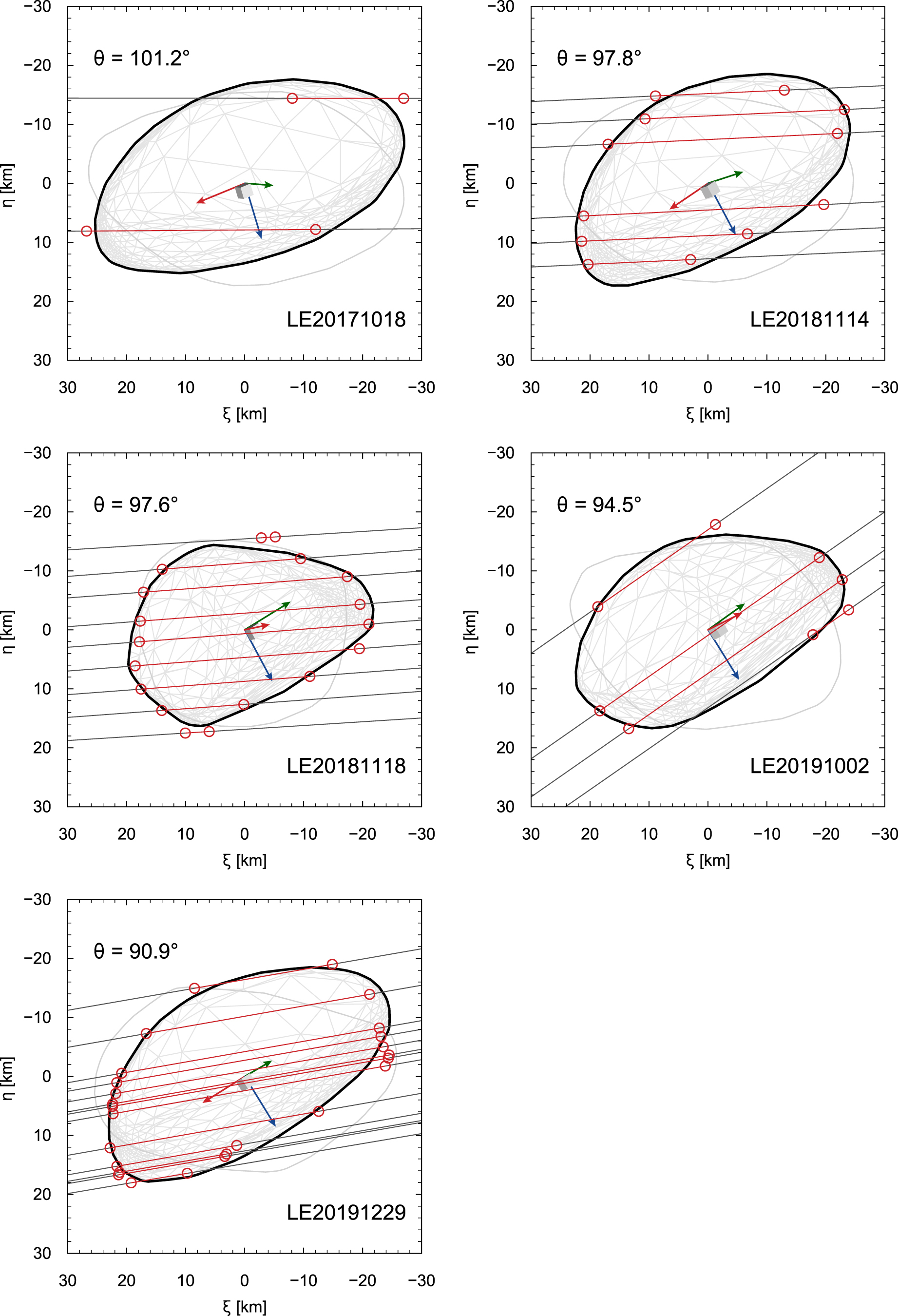
Silhouettes of Leucus observed in occultation events from 2017 to 2019, each with a shape model overlaid to fit the chords.

Leucus is a D-type asteroid, which is the dominant spectral type among the Jupiter trojans, with the remainder being mostly carbonaceous C-type and primitive P-type asteroids.

=== Slow rotator ===
During spring 2013, a rotational lightcurve of Leucus was obtained from photometric observations made by astronomers Robert Stephens and Daniel Coley at the Center for Solar System Studies (CS3), California, using a 0.35/0.4-meter Schmidt-Cassegrain telescope. The lightcurve showed an exceptionally slow rotation period of 513.7 hours with a brightness variation of 0.53 in magnitude (U=2+). No evidence of a non-principal axis rotation (NPAR) was found. It is one of the slowest rotators known to exist.

In preparation for the planned visit by the Lucy spacecraft, Leucus was once again observed by astronomers Marc Buie at SwRI and Stefano Mottola at DLR in 2016. The obtained bimodal lightcurve gave a somewhat shorter period of 440 hours and an amplitude of 0.7 magnitude.

=== Diameter and albedo ===
According to the surveys carried out by the Infrared Astronomical Satellite IRAS, and NASA's Wide-field Infrared Survey Explorer with its subsequent NEOWISE mission, Leucus has a low albedo of 0.06 and 0.08, with a diameter of 42.1 and 34.2 kilometers, respectively. The Collaborative Asteroid Lightcurve Link derives a lower albedo of 0.05 and a diameter of 42.1 kilometers, in accordance with the result obtained by IRAS.

== Naming ==
This minor planet was named from Greek mythology, after the Achaean warrior Leucus in Homer's Iliad. He was a companion of Odysseus. Leucus was killed during the Trojan War by Antiphus, one of the fifty sons of King Priam of Troy. The approved naming citation was published by the Minor Planet Center on 22 February 2016 (M.P.C. 98711).
