= Leucippus (son of Xanthius) =

Character in Greek mythology

In Greek mythology, Leucippus (Ancient Greek: Λεύκιππος, romanized: Leúkippos, lit. 'white horse') is a minor figure mentioned in the works of Parthenius of Nicaea who attributes the tale to the Hellenistic poet Hermesianax of Colophon. He is the son of Xanthius, a descendant of Bellerophon, by an unnamed mother.

== Mythology ==
Leucippus excelled in strength and valour, and was thus well known among the Lycians and their neighbours as well, who were constantly plundered and mistreated by him. He incurred the wrath of the goddess Aphrodite after an unspecified offence, and so the goddess made him fall in love with his own sister (who is not named). At first he tried to hold out and deny his passion, but in the end he confessed to his mother, and implored her to help him out or he would kill himself. His mother in pity obliged to her son's request and arranged for the sister to lie in bed with her brother.

Word of it spread out however, and reached the ears of the girl's betrothed, who confronted Xanthius about it without mentioning Leucippus by name. Xanthius was troubled greatly to learn that, until the betrothed's informer led him to the girl's bedchamber. The girl, frightened, tried to escape so she would not be caught together in bed with her brother, but due to the dark Xanthius mistook her for his daughter's unknown seducer and struck her with his dagger, killing her. She cried in pain as she died, and Leucippus then attacked Xanthius, not recognizing his father, killing him as well.

For the murder of his father Leucippus was exiled, and went to Thessaly and helped them invade Crete, then he went to Asia Minor where he colonized and founded Magnesia on the Maeander (modern Tekin in Turkey) near Ephesus. He did so after receiving an oracle that he would be leader for a colony sent out of Pherae by King Admetus, and when he besieged the city, a girl named Leucophryne fell in love with him and betrayed her own town for his sake.

== See also ==
- Pisidice of Methymna
- Myrrha
- Polyphonte
- Rhodopis and Euthynicus

== Bibliography ==
- Parthenius, Love Romances translated by Sir Stephen Gaselee (1882–1943), S. Loeb Classical Library Volume 69. Cambridge, MA. Harvard University Press. 1916. Online version at the Topos Text Project.
- Grimal, Pierre (1986). A Concise Dictionary of Classical Mythology. Translated by A. R. Maxwell-Hyslop. Oxford: Basil Blackwell, Ltd. ISBN 0-631-16696-3.
