= Evaechme =

In Greek mythology, the name Evaechme, Euaechme or Euaichme (Ancient Greek: Εὐαίχμη) may refer to:

- Evaechme, a Megarian princess as daughter of King Megareus and Iphinoe, daughter of King Nisus, thus sister of Evippus and Timalcus. She was the second wife of Alcathous, son of Pelops and by him, became the mother of Ischepolis, Callipolis, Iphinoe and Periboea. Otherwise, the mother of these children was Pyrgo.
- Evaechme, daughter of Hyllus and Iole, wife of Polycaon, the son of the Argonaut Butes.
