= Onchestos (mythology) =

Ancient Greek mythological figure

Onchestus
- Eponym of Onchestos
- Member of the Royal House of Onchestus
- Other names: Onchestos
- Abode: Boeotia (Onchestus)
- Parents: Poseidon
- Offspring: Abrota and Megareus

In Greek mythology, Onchestos or Onchestus (Ancient Greek: Ογχηστός) was the eponymous founder of the city of Onchestos in Boeotia, where the Onchestian Poseidon had a temple and a statue.

== Family ==
Little is known about Onchestos and only two literary sources (Plutarch in Quaestiones Graecae and Pausanias in Description of Greece) gave information about him. In these accounts, he was described as the Boeotian son of Poseidon and father of Megareus and Abrota, wife of King Nisos. Onchestus's son and son-in-law were listed as kings of Megara.

In some traditions, Onchestus was called the son of Boeotus.

== Mythology ==
=== Plutarch's account ===
When Nisus, from whom Nisaea acquired its name, was king, he took a wife from Boeotia, Habrotê, daughter of Onchestus, the sister of Megareus, a woman who, as it appears, was both exceptionally intelligent and remarkably discreet.

=== Pausanias' account ===
Distant from this mountain fifteen stades are the ruins of the city Onchestus. They say that here dwelt Onchestus, a son of Poseidon. In my day there remained a temple and image of Onchestian Poseidon, and the grove which Homer too praised.

== Grove of Onchestos ==
In ancient times the city of Onchestos was famous for its sanctuary of Poseidon and is mentioned in the famous "Catalogue of Ships" in Homer's Iliad where it is referred to as the god's "bright grove."

In the Homeric Hymns to Apollo the grove is also mentioned:

And further still you went, O far-shooting Apollo, and came to Onchestus, Poseidon's bright grove: there the new-broken colt distressed with drawing the trim chariot gets spirit again, and the skilled driver springs from his car and goes on his way. Then the horses for a while rattle the empty car, being rid of guidance; and if they break the chariot in the woody grove, men look after the horses, but tilt the chariot and leave it there; for this was the rite from the very first. And the drivers pray to the lord of the shrine; but the chariot falls to the lot of the god.
