= Antaeus =

Character in Greek and Berber mythology

- Giant King of Libya
- Member of the Libyan Royal Family
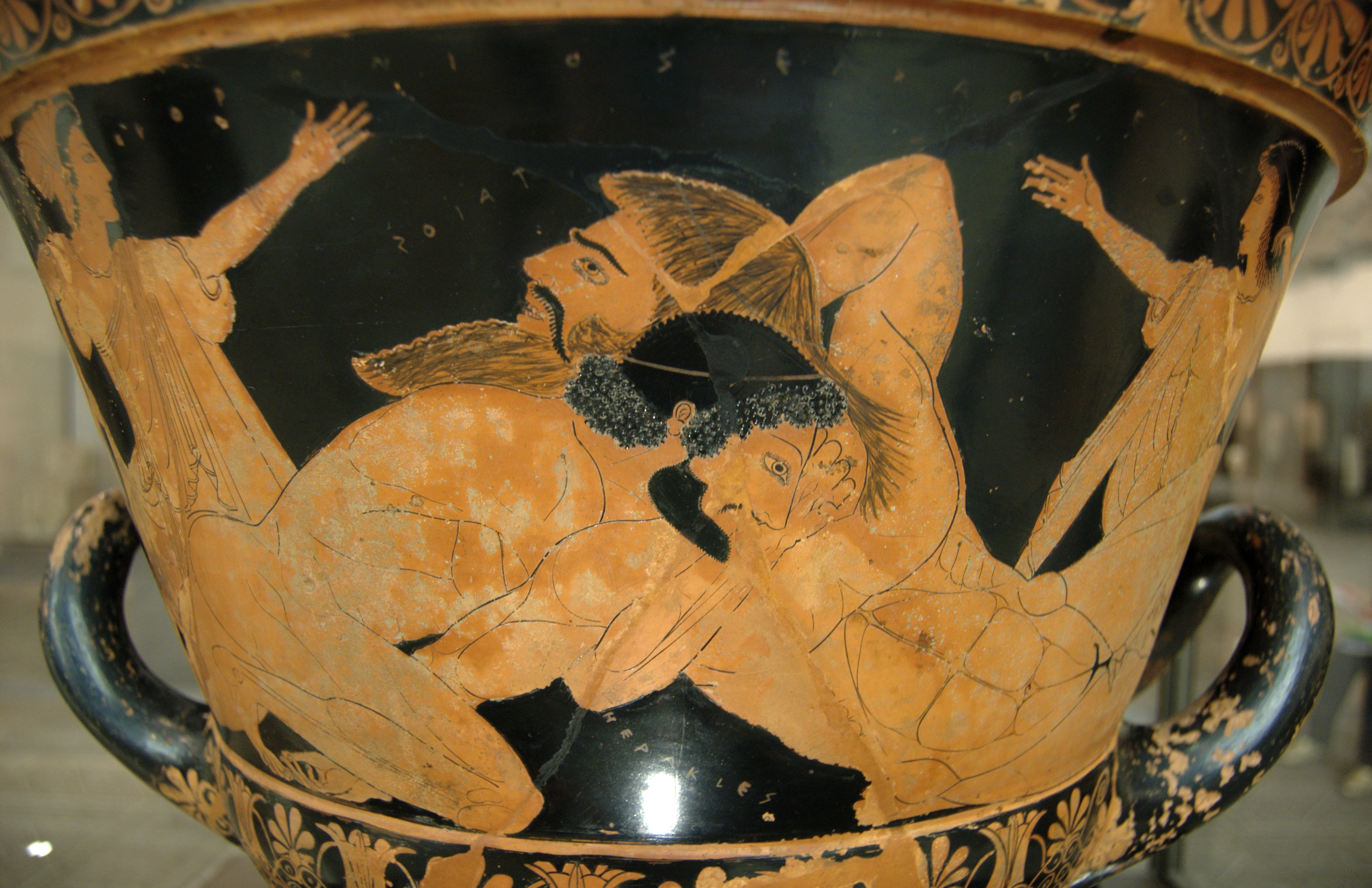
- Heracles and Antaeus, red-figured krater by Euphronios, 515–510 BC, Louvre
- Other names: Anti
- Abode: Libya

Genealogy
- Parents: Poseidon and Gaia
- Consort: Tinjis
- Children: Iphinoe

Antaeus (/ænˈtiːəs/; Ancient Greek: Ἀνταῖος, romanized: Antaîos, lit. 'opponent', derived from ἀντάω, antáō, 'I face, I oppose'), known to the Berbers as Anti, was a figure in Berber and Greek mythology. He was famed for his defeat by Heracles as part of the Labours of Heracles.

== Family ==
In Greek sources, he was the son of Poseidon and Gaia, who lived in the interior desert of Libya. According to the Roman geographer Pomponius Mela, his wife was the goddess Tinjis, for whom it was claimed that the city of Tangier in Morocco was named (though it could be the other way around). Another daughter, Iphinoe, consorted with Heracles.

== Mythology ==
Antaeus would challenge all passers-by to wrestling matches and remained invincible as long as he remained in contact with his mother, the earth. As Greek wrestling, like its modern equivalent, typically attempted to force opponents to the ground, he always won, killing his opponents. He built a temple to his father using their skulls. Antaeus fought Heracles as he was on his way to the Garden of Hesperides as his 11th Labour. Heracles realized that he could not beat Antaeus by throwing or pinning him. Instead, he held him aloft and then crushed him to death in a bear hug.

The earliest representations of the myth in ancient Greek art date to the 6th century BC, and originate mostly from Attica. In depictions, Antaeus has a lengthy beard and a hairy body; his large size is sometimes portrayed, though he is often shrunk owing to space constraints. Other figures – such as Athena, Hermes, or a man or woman – are often present in the scene. Representations which portray the point at which Heracles lifts Antaeus do not appear initially, perhaps arising only in the latter half of the 5th century BC; this scene achieved popularity in the following century. The contest between Heracles and Antaeus was a favored subject in Renaissance sculpture.

=== Location in Africa ===
Antaeus is placed in the interior desert of Libya. He was probably incorporated into Greek mythology after the Greek colonization of Cyrenaica in the mid-seventh century BC.

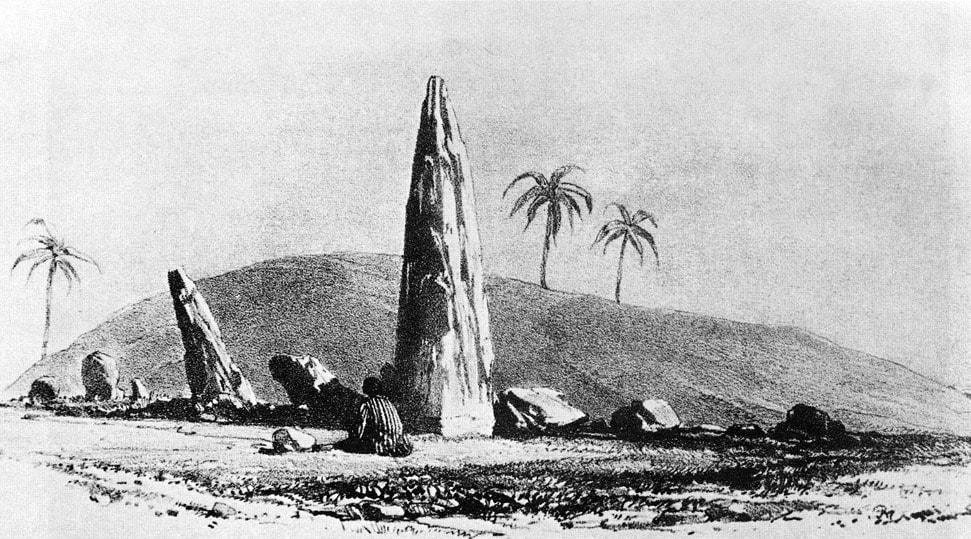
Msoura in 1830

A location for Antaeus somewhere far within the Berber world might be quite flexible in longitude: when the Roman commander Quintus Sertorius crossed from Hispania to North Africa, he was told by the residents of Tingis (Tangier), far to the west of Libya, that the gigantic remains of Antaeus would be found within a certain tumulus; digging it open, his men found giant bones; closing the site, Sertorius made propitiatory offerings and "helped to magnify the tomb's reputation". It is proposed that this monument is the Msoura stone circle, 50 km from Tangier. In Book IV of Marcus Annaeus Lucanus' epic poem Pharsalia (c. AD 65-61), the story of Heracles' victory over Antaeus is told to the Roman Curio by an unnamed Libyan citizen. The learned client king Juba II (died 23 AD), husband of the daughter of Antony and Cleopatra, claimed his descent from a liaison of Heracles with Tinga, the consort of Antaeus. In his Life of Sertorius cited above, Plutarch recounts what he says to be a local myth, according to which Heracles consorted with Tinge after the death of Antaeus and had by her a son, Sophax, who named the city of Tingis after his mother. Sophax in his turn was father of Diodorus, who conquered many Libyan peoples with his army of Olbians and Mycenaeans brought to Libya by Heracles. Moreover, some related that Heracles had a son, Palaemon, by Iphinoe, the daughter of Antaeus and (presumably) Tinge.

The ancient city of Barca, possibly located at Marj, Libya, was also called Antapolis after Antaeus. Antaeopolis is also the Graeco-Roman name of Tjebu, an Egyptian city. They identified the tutelary god of Tjebu, Nemty, a fusion of Seth and Horus, with Antaeus, although he may be different from the Libyan Antaeus.

== Gallery ==
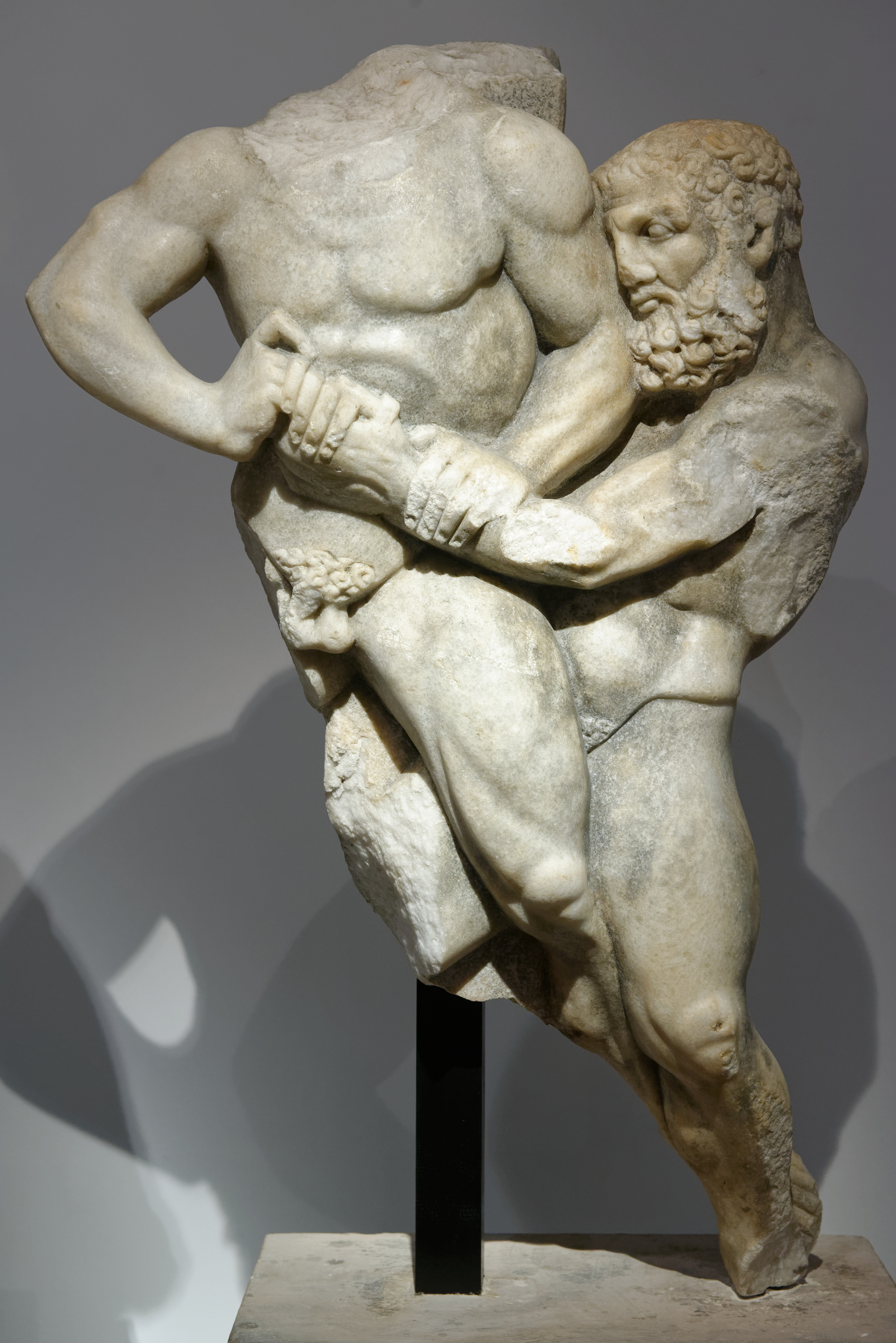
Sculpture from the late Hellenistic period, a copy of an original from the 5th or 4th century BC

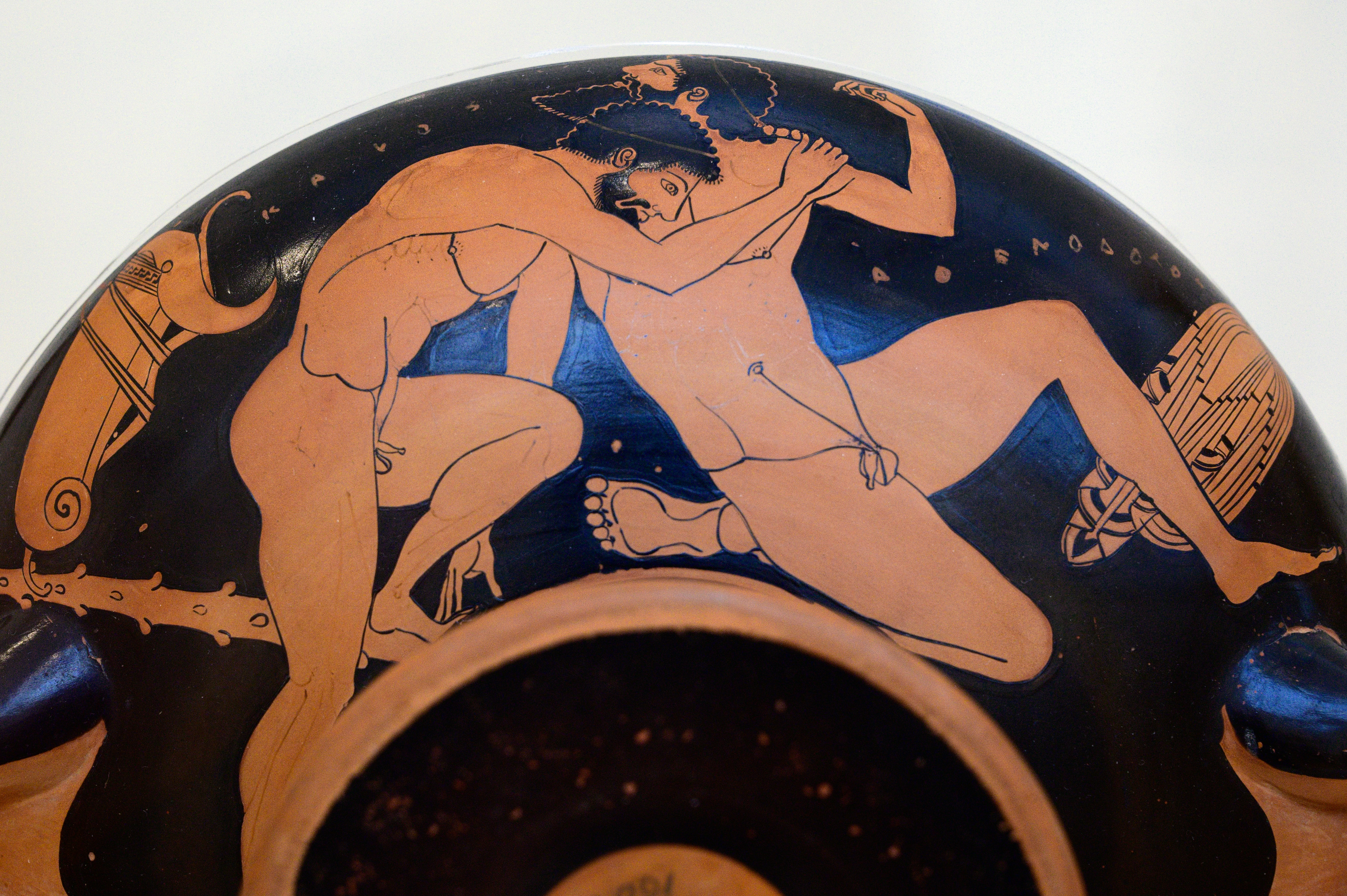
Attic red-figure kylix, dating to c. 500 BC

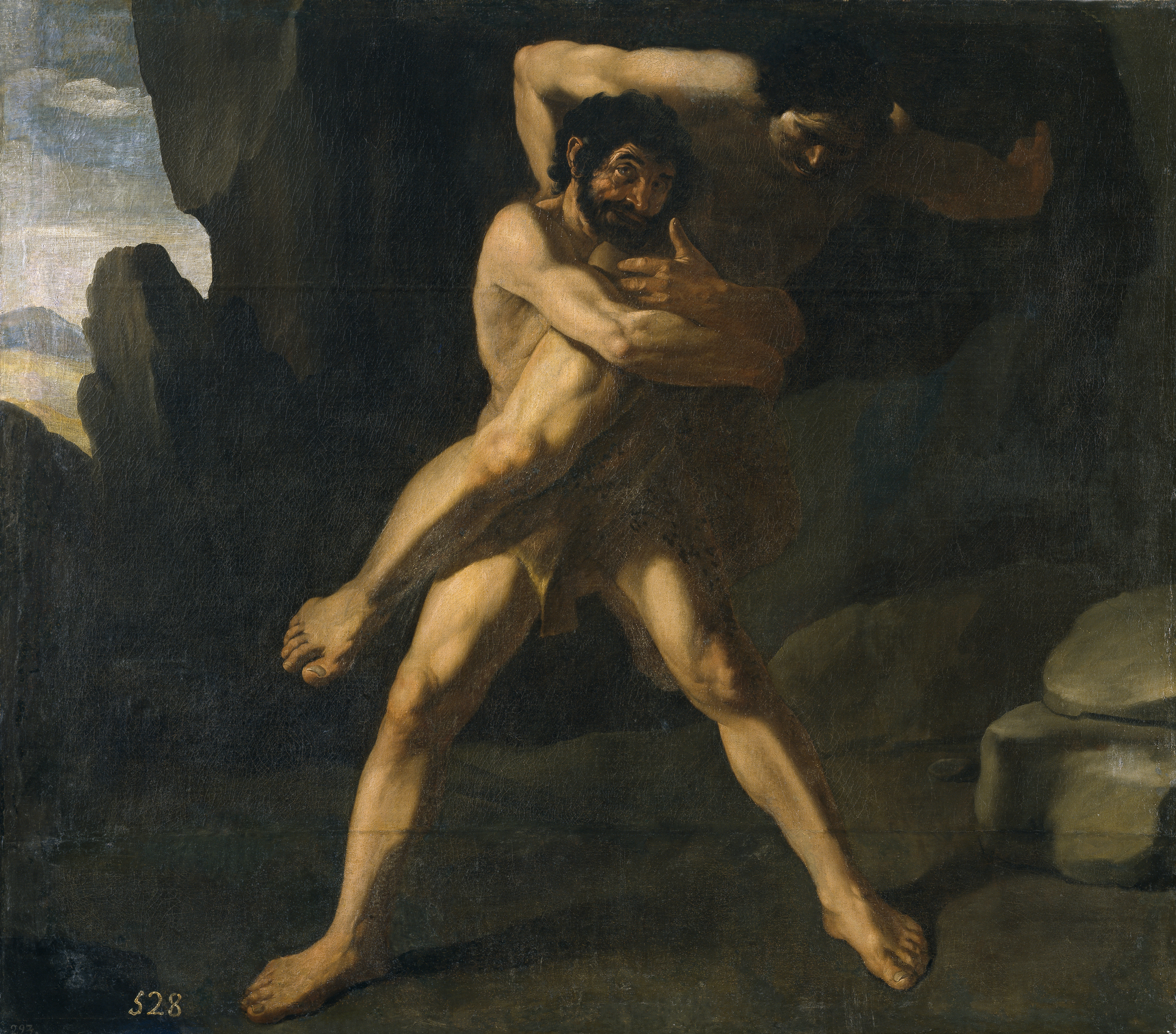
A 1634 painting by Francisco de Zurbarán

== See also ==
- Anteosaurus, a giant dinocephalian therapsid named after Antaeus
- Antey, romanization of Антей, the Russian rendering of Antaeus
