= Pedasus (Mysia) =

Town of ancient Mysia, now Turkey

Pedasus or Pedasos (Ancient Greek: Πήδασος), also known as Pedasa (Πήδασα), was a small town of ancient Mysia, on the river Satnioeis. It is mentioned by Homer in the Iliad, but was deserted in the time of Strabo. Strabo (p. 584) mentions it among the towns of the Leleges, which were destroyed by Achilles. Pliny the Elder imagines that Pedasus was the same place as that which subsequently bore the name of Adramyttium; but as Homer distinctly places it on the river Satnioeis, the supposition is impossible.

According to one myth, the city was once known as Monenia, and was besieged by Achilles. He struggled to capture it however and was about to give up when a maiden of Monenia sent him a message on an apple, encouraging him to keep trying because the city was suffering due to water shortage. Thus Achilles continued the war until Monenia fell. He then renamed it to Pedasus or Pedasa, after the girl who helped him take it. This myth shares many elements with that of Achilles and Pisidice.

Its site is unlocated.
