= Idomeneus (son of Deucalion) =

Greek mythical character, King of Crete

- King of Crete
- Member of the Cretan Royal Family
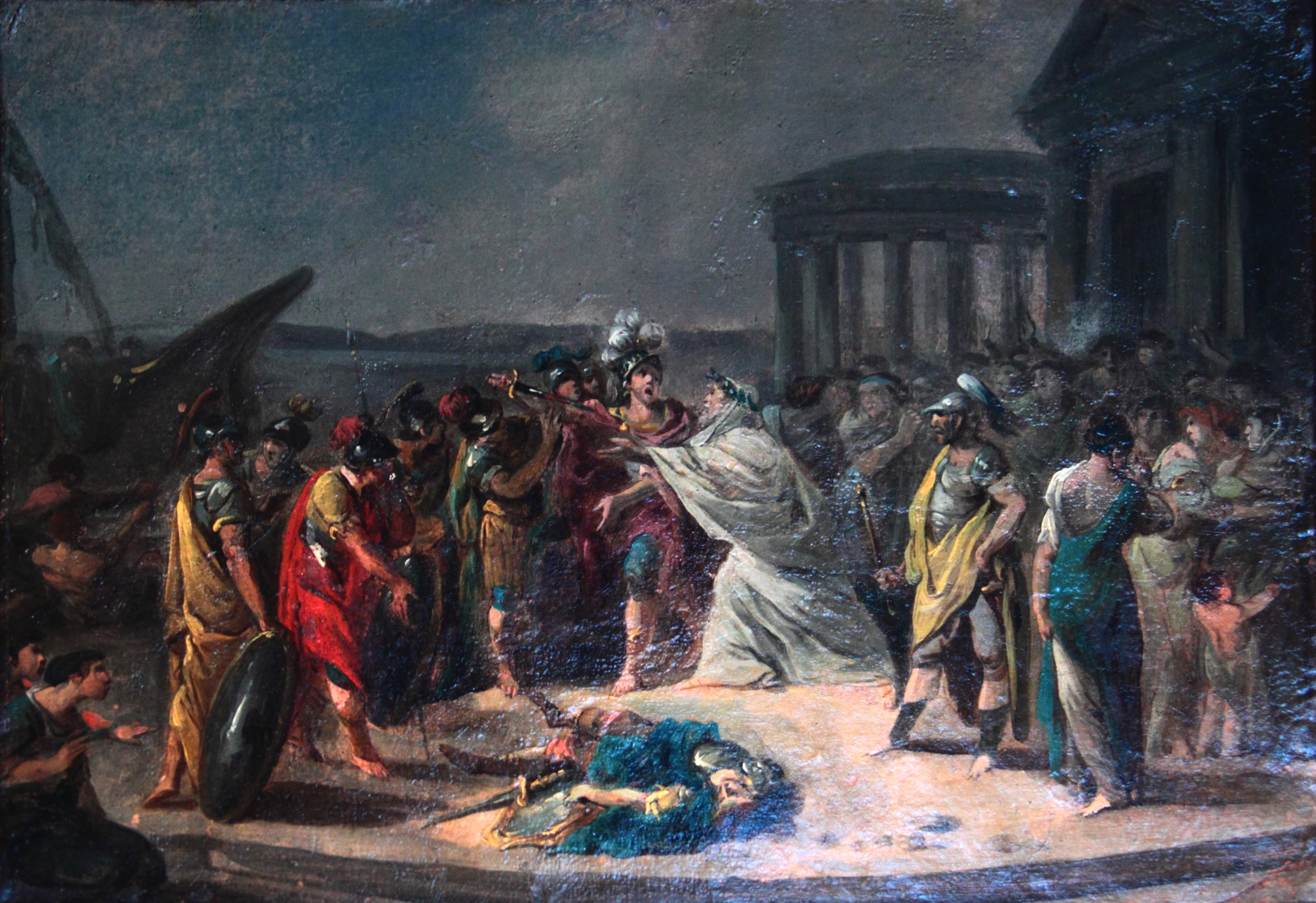
- Idomeneus coming back, Palais Niel, France
- Predecessor: Catreus
- Successor: Leucus
- Abode: Crete
- Parents: Deucalion and Cleopatra
- Consort: Meda
- Offspring: Orsilochus, Cleisithyra, Iphiclus and Lycus

In Greek mythology, Idomeneus (/aɪˈdɒmɪniəs/; Greek: Ἰδομενεύς) was a Cretan king and commander who led the Cretan armies to the Trojan War, in eighty black ships. He was also one of the suitors of Helen, as well as a comrade of the Telamonian Ajax. Meriones was his charioteer and brother-in-arms.

== Description ==
Idomeneus was described by the chronicler Malalas in his account of the Chronography as "above average height, dark-skinned, good eyes, well set, strong, good nose, thick beard, good head, curly hair, a berserker when fighting".

== Family ==
Idomeneus was the son of Deucalion and Cleopatra, grandson of King Minos of Crete and Queen Pasiphaë, thus tracing his line from Helios the sun god. He was husband of Meda by whom she became the mother of Orsilochus, Cleisithyra, Iphiclus and Lycus.

== Mythology ==
In Homer's Iliad, Idomeneus is found among the first rank of the Greek generals, leading his troops and engaging the enemy head-on, and escaping serious injury. Idomeneus was one of Agamemnon's trusted advisors. He was one of the primary defenders when most of the other Achaean heroes were injured, and even fought Hector briefly and repulsed his attack. Like most of the other leaders of the Greeks, he is alive and well as the story comes to a close. He was one of the Achaeans to enter the Trojan Horse. Idomeneus killed twenty men and at least three Amazon women, including Bremusa, at Troy.

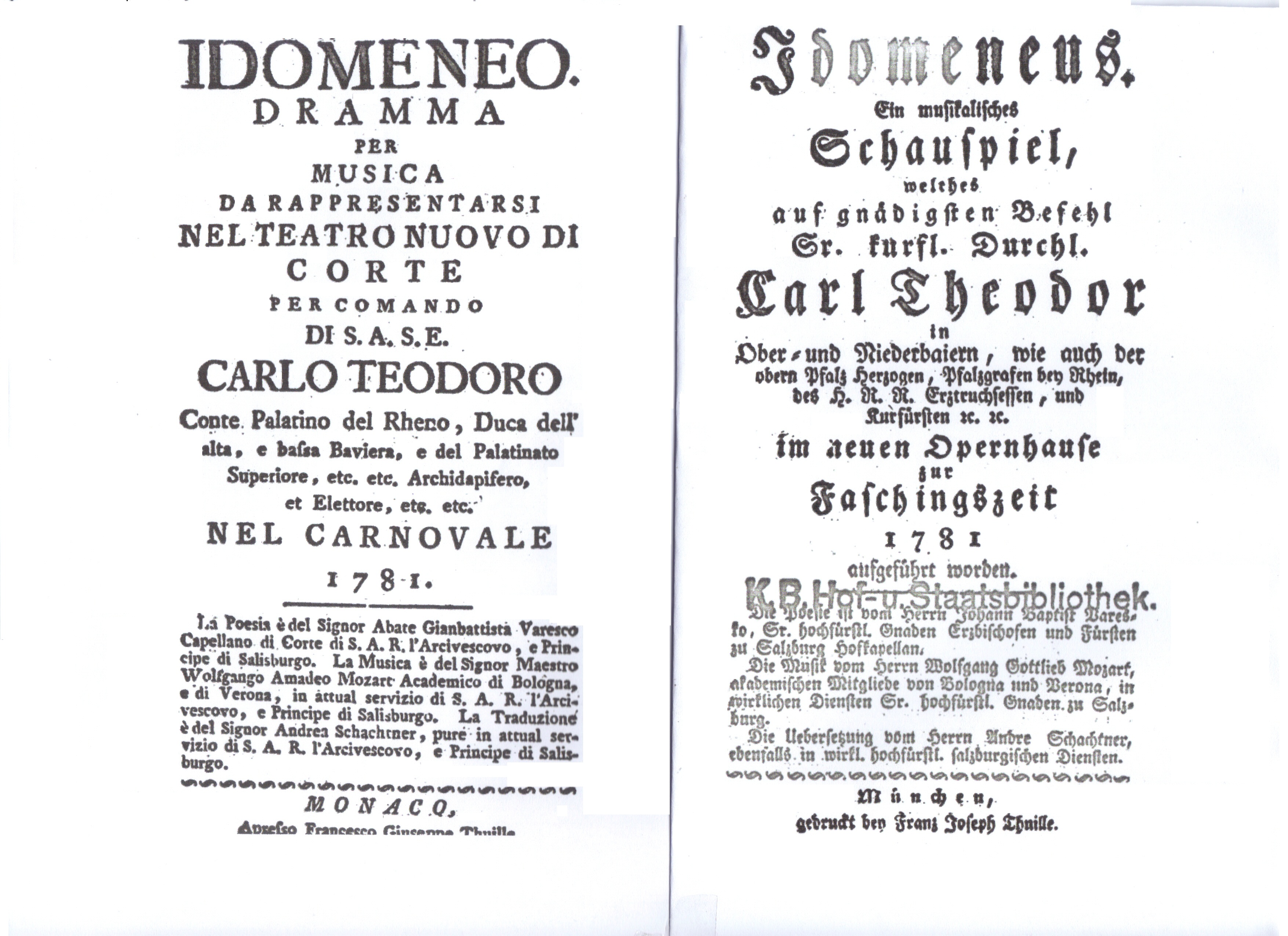
Italian and German title pages of the original libretto of Mozart's opera, Idomeneo

A later tradition, preserved by Servius the Grammarian in a commentary on Virgil's Aeneid, continues the story as follows: after the war, Idomeneus's ship hit a terrible storm. He promised Poseidon that he would sacrifice the first living thing he saw when he returned home if Poseidon would save his ship and crew. The first living thing was his son, whom Idomeneus duly sacrificed. The gods were angry at Idomeneus's murder of his own son and sent a plague to Crete. The Cretans sent him into exile in Calabria (ancient name of the Salento in Apulia), Italy and then Colophon in Asia Minor where he died. According to Marcus Terrentius Varro, the gens Salentini descended from Idomeneus, who had sailed from Crete to Illyria, and then together with Illyrians and Locrians from Illyria to Salento, see Grecìa Salentina.

Alternatively, in a tradition preserved by Apollodorus, Idomeneus was driven out of Crete by Leucus, his foster son, who had seduced and then killed Idomeneus' wife Meda and usurped the throne of Crete. Yet according to Porphyry, when Idomeneus returned from Troy, he sacked Lyctus and other cities that had been taken by Leucus.

The tale is also covered by the French 17th century writer François Fénelon.

Idomeneo, a 1781 opera seria by Mozart, is based on the story of Idomeneus's return to Crete. In this version, Poseidon (Neptune in the opera) spares Idomeneo's son Idamante, on condition that Idomeneo relinquish his throne to the new generation.

== Gallery ==
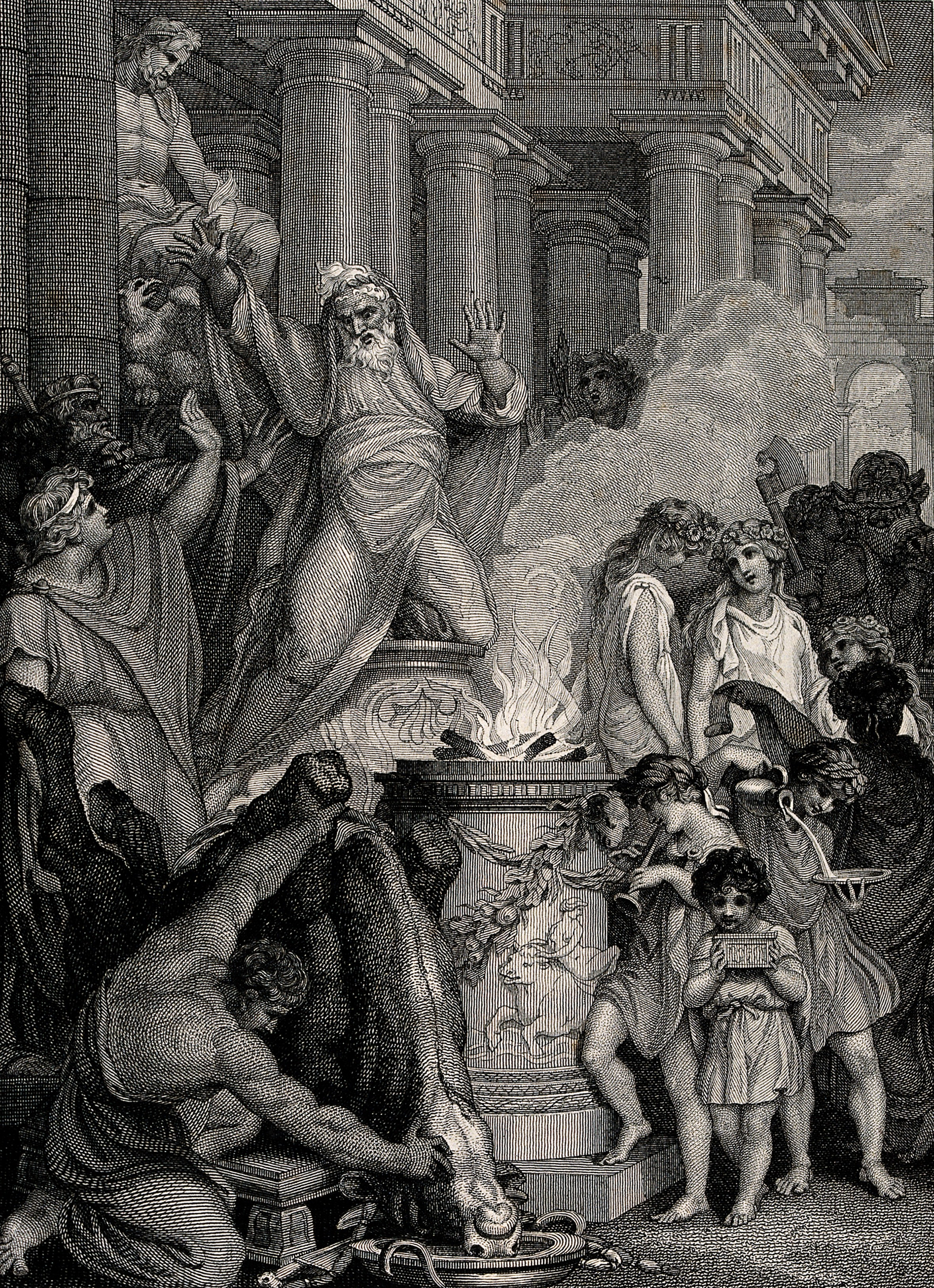
The sacrifice of Idomeneus to Jupiter, engraving by W. Skelt Wellcome

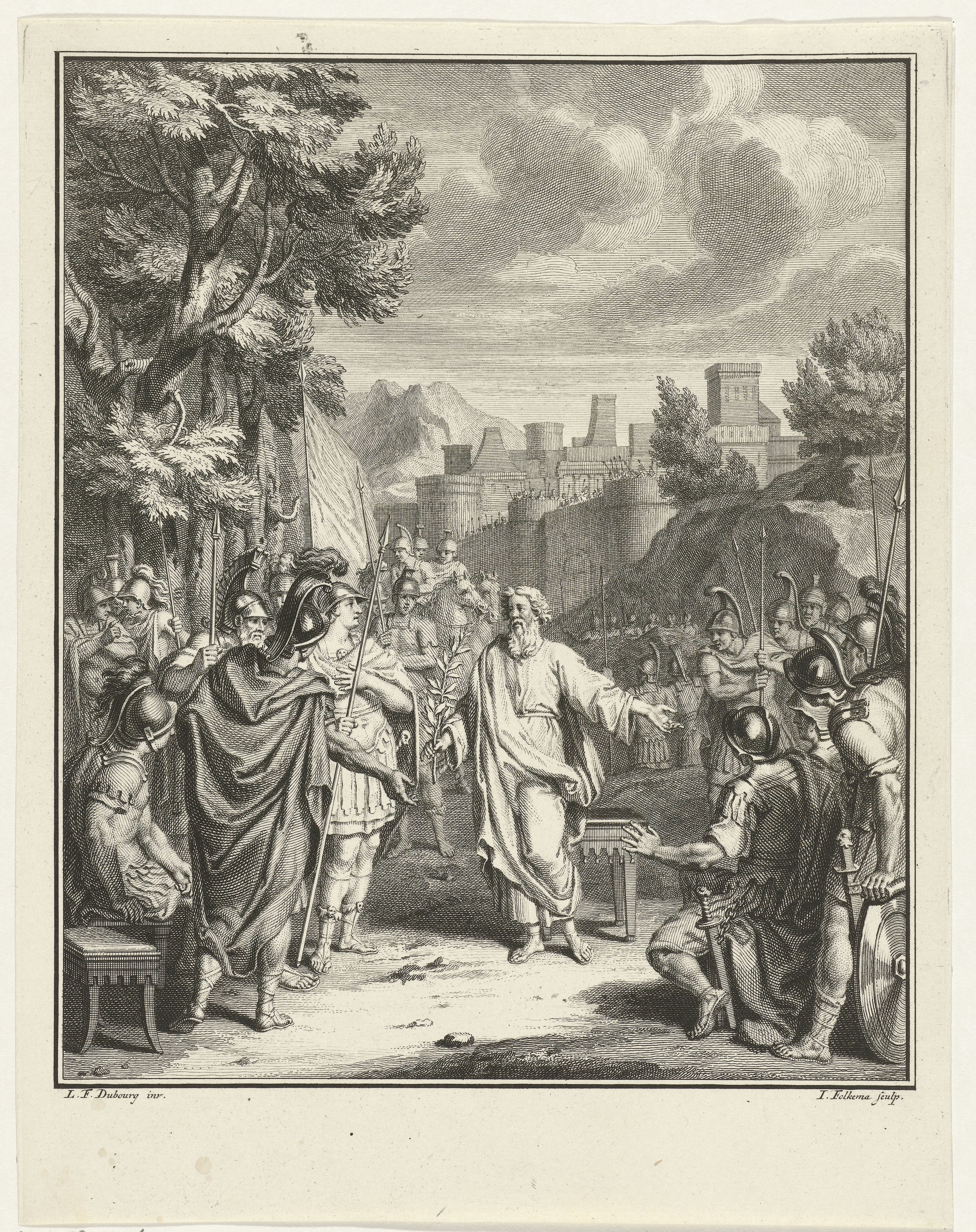
Mentor offers Idomeneus an olive branch to Adventures of Telemachus by Jacob Folkema

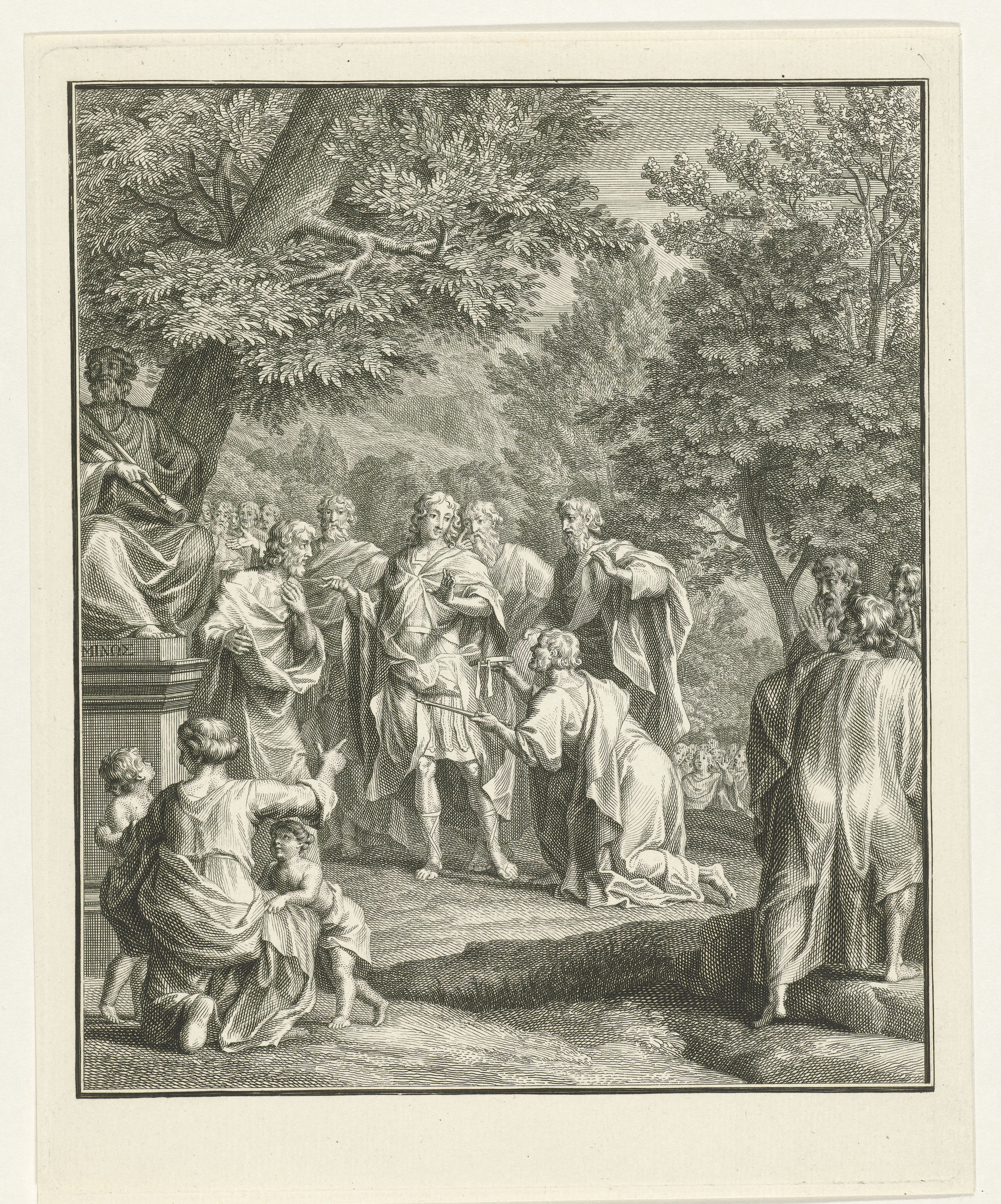
Telemachus refuses the crown and sceptre of the Cretan by Jacob Folkema

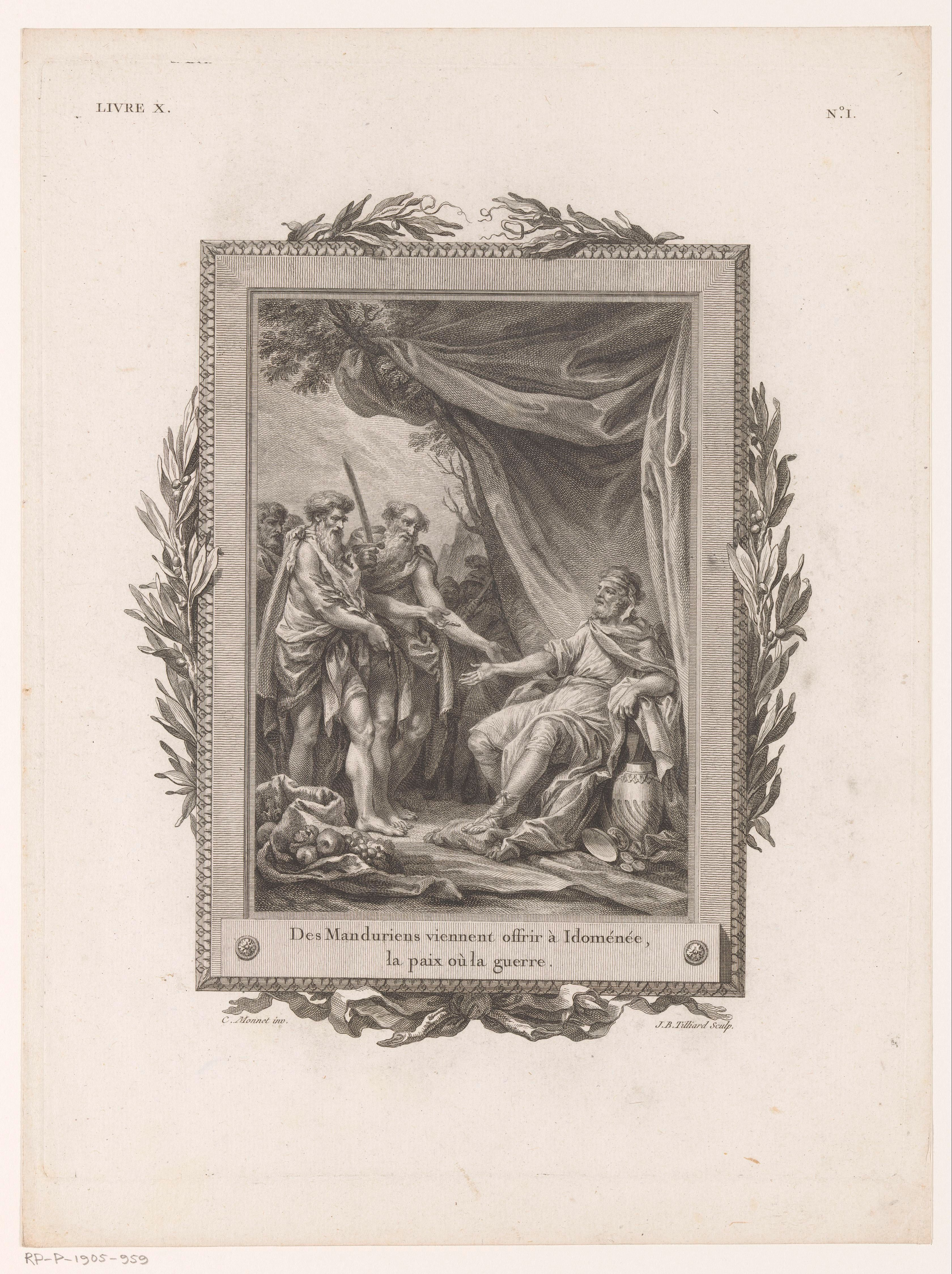
Idomeneus is offered war and peace by Jean-Baptiste Tilliard

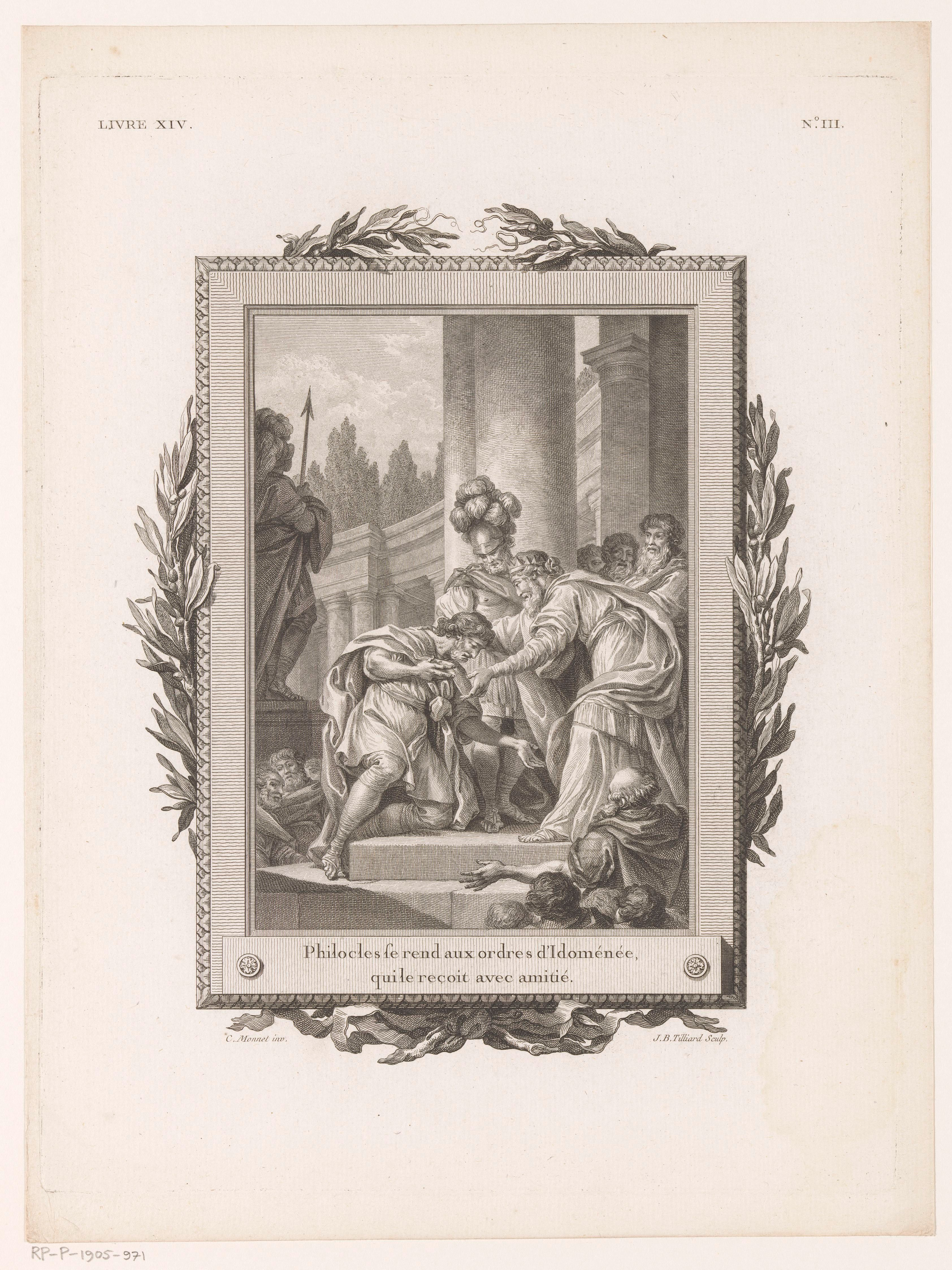
Philocles is received amicably by Idomeneus, by Jean-Baptiste Tilliard

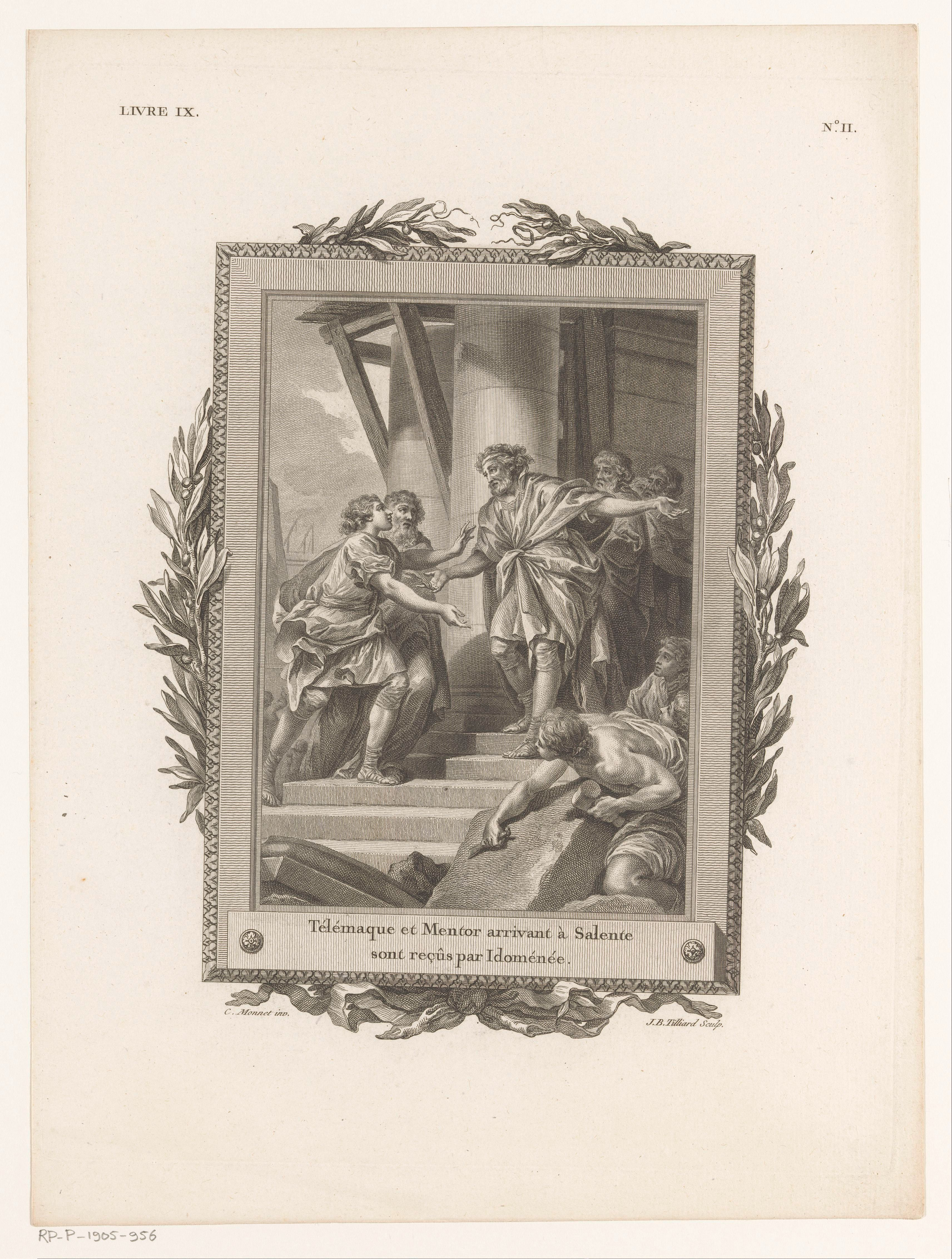
Telemachus and Mentor received by Idomeneus, by Jean-Baptiste Tilliard

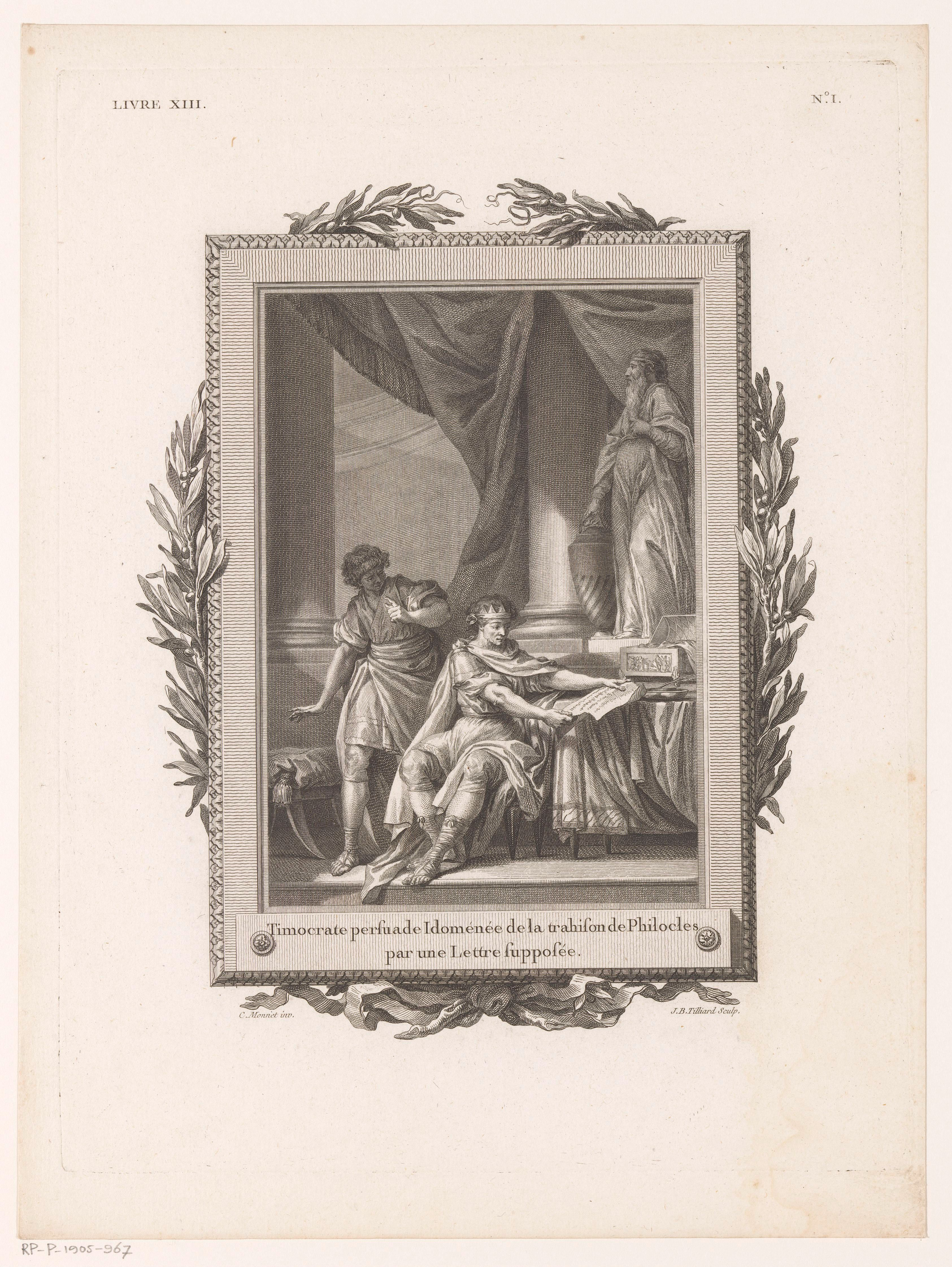
Timocrates convinces Idomeneus of Philocles ' betrayal by Jean-Baptiste Tilliard

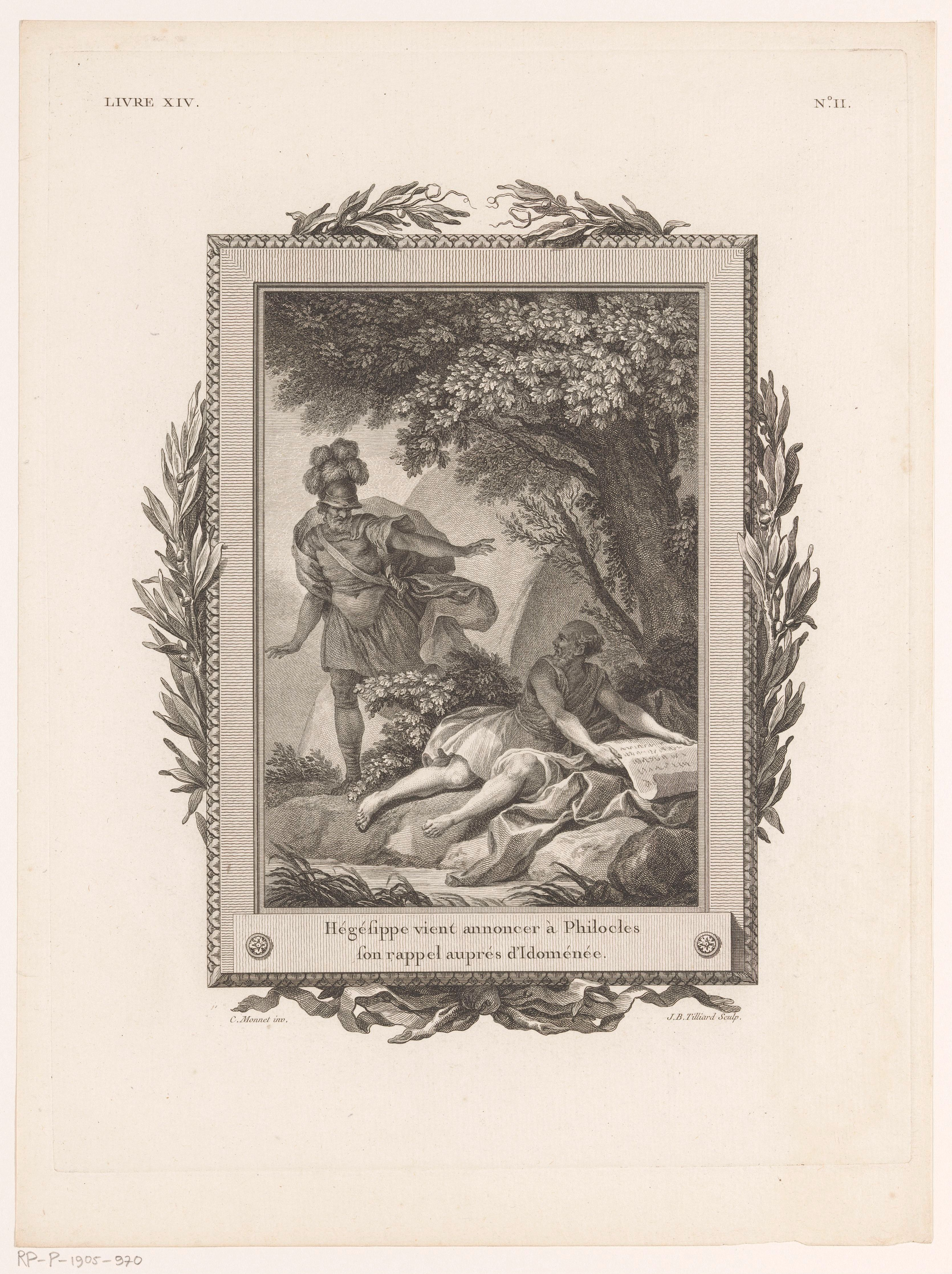
Hegesippus summons Philocles to return at the request of Idomeneus by Jean-Baptiste Tilliard

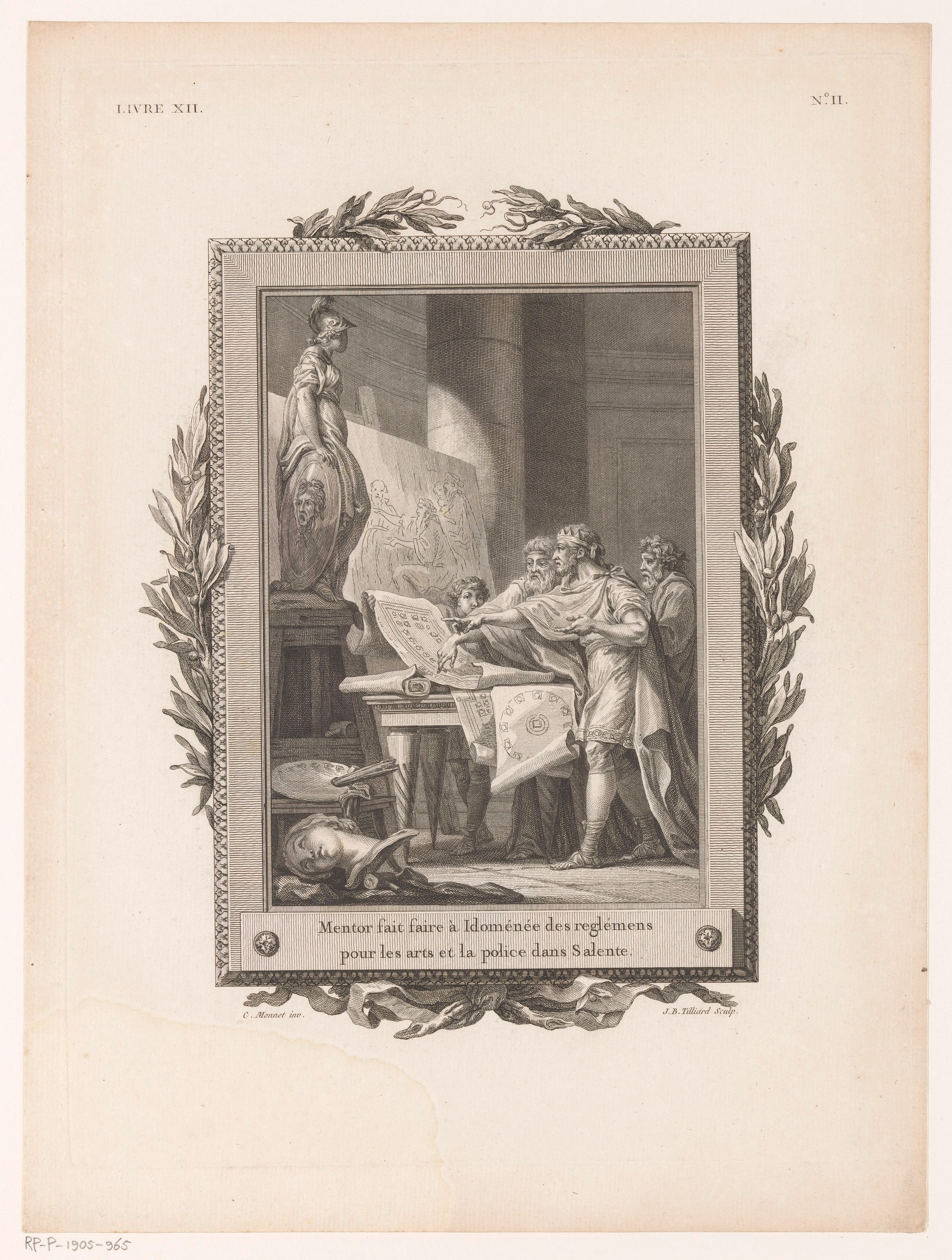
Mentor shows Idomeneus regulations for the arts and police by Jean-Baptiste Tilliard
