= Diodorus (son of Sufax) =

- Progenitor of the Numidians
- Reign: unknown
- Predecessor: Sufax
- Successor: unknown
- Greek: Διόδωρος
- House: Massylii

Diodorus was a legendary king and progenitor of the Numidian dynasty, he was the son of Sufax, a hero in Berber and Greek mythology.

According to the Berber mythology, many of the Berber Numidian kings are descendants of Diodorus, who defended their lands and reigned over many North African Berber tribes with the help of the Olympians.

The ancient Greek historian Plutarch says that many of the myths were created in order to give credits to the Numidian king Juba II who considered himself a descendant of Diodorus and Hercules, making him with Sufax a progenitor of the Numidian dynasty.
