= Tinjis =

Deity and wife of Antaeus in Berber and Greek mythology

- Queen of Libya
- Member of the Libyan Royal Family
- Other names: Tinga, Tingis
- Abode: Libya

Genealogy
- Consort: (1) Antaeus (2) Heracles
- Children: (1) Alceis or Barce and Iphinoe (probably) (2) Sufax

Tinjis (Berber languages: ⵜⵉⵏⵊⴰ, romanized: Tinja) (also called Tinga, and also spelled as Tingis) was a Libyan queen as the wife of King Antaeus in Berber and Greek mythology, and some kind of a female deity.

== Family ==
Tinjis' husband was the son of Poseidon and Gaia. Tinjis bore Antaeus daughters named Alceis or Barce and probably Iphinoe who mothered Palaemon by the hero Heracles.

== Mythology ==
The historian and archaeologist Mustapha Ouachi noticed that the city Tangier is geographically related to its myth. The mother of Antaeus was the goddess of the Earth whereas the father of Antaeus was Poseidon who was the god of the sea, according to the Libyan legend. In addition, Herodotus considered Poseidon to be an ancient Libyan god that was adopted by the ancient Greeks, like Athena.

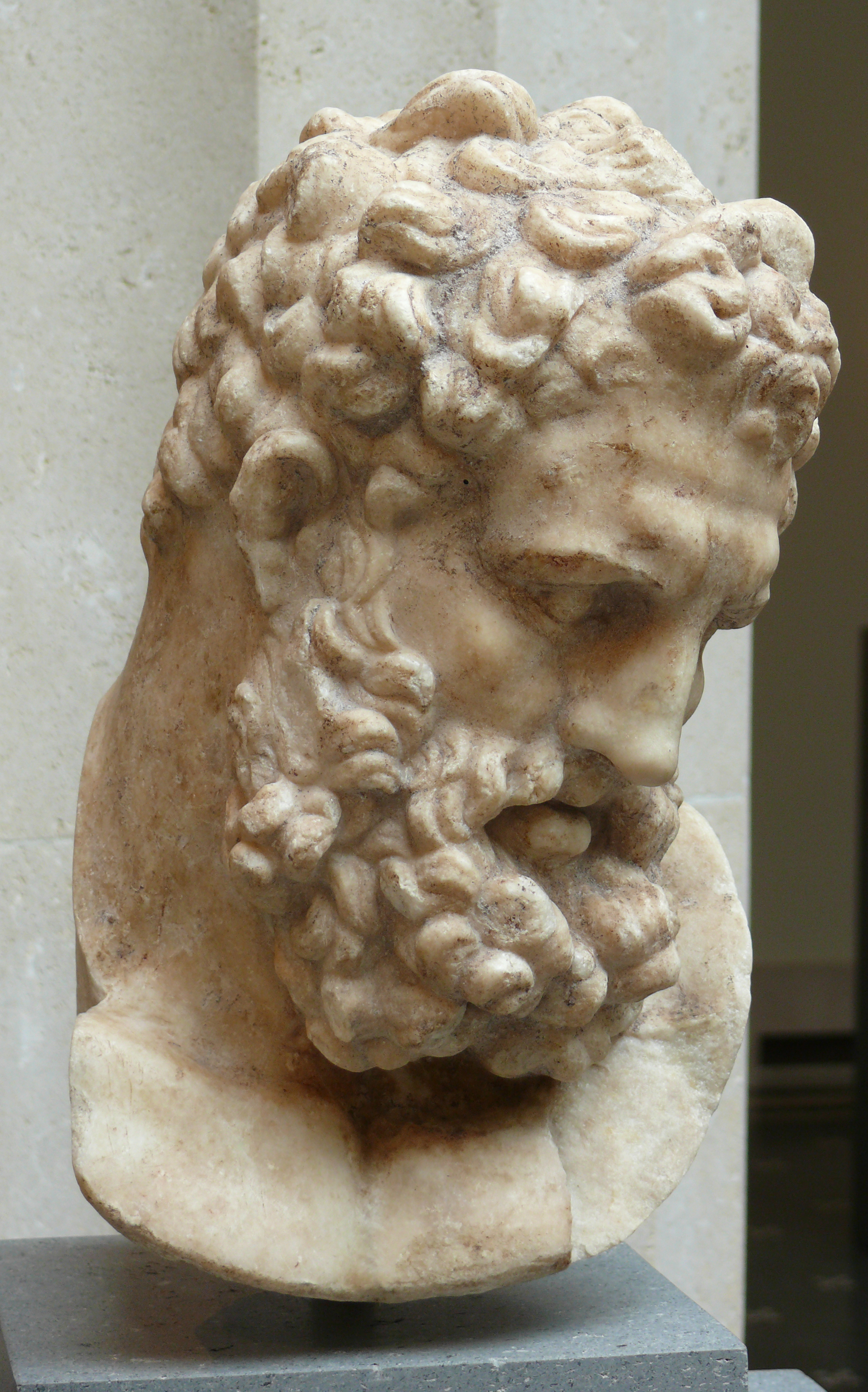
Heracles was the second spouse of Tinjis

According to Plutarch, the Amazigh believed that Heracles consorted with Tinjis after the death of Antaeus and that Heracles and Tinjis were the parents of Sufax. According to their myth, Sufax built the city Tingis (now called Tangier) and named it after his mother.

In fact, Tangier is believed to have been built by Berbers. It was an important city of the kingdom of Mauretania. The name of Sufax, mythical king and founder of Tangier, is similar to that of Syphax, king of the Masaesyli tribe of western Numidia.
