= Timalcus =

In Greek mythology, Timalcus (Ancient Greek: Τίμαλκον) was a Megarian prince as the son of Megareus, eponymous king of Megara.

== Family ==
Timalcus’ mother was Iphinoe, daughter of King Nisus of Megara. He was the brother of Evaechme, wife of Alcathous, and Evippus who was slain by the Cithaeronian lion.

== Mythology ==
Timalcus was killed by Theseus while he was in the campaign with the Dioscuri against Aphidnae but this seems unbelievable as Alcman wrote a poem on the Dioscuri, in which he says that the twin sons of Zeus captured Athens and carried into captivity Aethra, mother of Theseus, but the latter himself was absent.
