= Agraeus =

Agraeus (Greek: Ἀγραῖος, Agraios) was the name of a number of personages from ancient myth, but was primarily known as an epithet of the god Apollo in Greek mythology, which meant "the hunter". After Apollo had killed the Lion of Cithaeron, a temple was erected to him by Alcathous, son of Pelops, at Megara under the name of Apollo Agraeus (some accounts report that Alcathous himself killed the lion). The epithet was also sometimes used, in the feminine form Agraea (or Agraia), for the goddess Artemis, which was synonymous with her epithet Agrotera.

There is also evidence, attested to by Philo, that "Agraeus" was a minor god-figure in the mythology of Phoenicia who invented hunting.

There was also a Heraclid named Agraeus, the son of Temenus, and youngest brother of Hyrnetho (Ὑρνηθώ), wife of Deiphontes (Δηιφόντης). He was the only one of Hyrnetho's four brothers who refused to participate in the plot to break up her marriage to Deiphontes.

According to Justinus, Agraeus was also the name of a son of Aristaeus (who was himself sometimes identified as "Agraeus"), the mythological founder of Cyrene.
