= Iphinoe (mythology) =

Set of mythological Greek characters

In Greek mythology, the name Iphinoe (Ancient Greek: Ἰφινόη) may refer to:

- Iphinoe, an Argive princess as one of the daughters of King Proetus and Stheneboea (Proetids). She and her sisters Lysippe and Iphianassa were driven mad (either because they didn't accept the rites of Dionysus, or else because they disparaged a wooden statue of Hera) and ran off into the wilderness like maenads. Melampus had to pursue them in order to provide a cure; Iphinoe died in the pursuit, but her sisters did eventually recover their wits through purification rites.
- Iphinoe, a Megarian princess as daughter of King Nisos and Abrota of Onchestus, thus sister to Eurynome and Scylla. She was the mother of Timalcus, Evippus and Evaechme by Megareus, her maternal uncle.
- Iphinoe, also a Megarian princess as daughter of King Alcathous by either Pyrgo or Evaechme (daughter of the precedent). She died a maiden, and it was a custom for the girls of Megara to bring libations to her tomb and to dedicate a lock of hair to her before their marriage.
- Iphinoe, in one version, mother of Daedalus by Metion.
- Iphinoe, a Lemnian herald of Hypsipyle, who welcomed the Argonauts upon their arrival at Lemnos.
- Iphinoe, the Libyan daughter of Antaeus and Tinjis, mother of Palaemon by Heracles. Otherwise, the mother of Palaemon was called Autonoë, daughter of Pireus.
