= Antey =

Antey may refer to:

- Antey-Saint-André, a comune in the Aosta Valley region of northwestern Italy
- Project 949A Antey, an Oscar-class submarine series of Soviet nuclear-powered cruise missile submarines
- Antey-300, a long range surface-to-air missile
- Antey-2500, a Russian anti-ballistic missile system
- Antey Concern, a defense industry company based in Moscow, Russia, merged into Almaz-Antey Corporation
- Antonov An-22 "Antey", Soviet and Russian heavy military transport aircraft

== See also ==
- Antei
