= Alcathous (son of Pelops) =

Ancient Greek mythological figure

Alcathous or Alcathoos (/ælˈkæθoʊ.əs/; Ancient Greek: Ἀλκάθοος) was in Greek mythology, a Pisatian prince who became a king of Megara.

== Family ==
He was the son of King Pelops of Pisa and Hippodamia, and brother of Atreus and Thyestes. He first married Pyrgo and afterwards Euaechme, and was the father of Ischepolis (Ἰσχέπολις), Callipolis (Καλλίπολις), Iphinoe, Periboea, and Automedusa.

== Mythology ==
Pausanias relates that after Euippus, son of king Megareus, was killed by the Lion of Cithaeron, Megareus, whose elder son Timalcus had likewise fallen by the hands of Theseus, offered his daughter Euaechme and his kingdom to anyone who could slay the lion. Alcathous undertook the task, killed the lion, and thus obtained Euaechme for his wife, and afterwards became the successor of Megareus. In gratitude for this success, he built at Megara a temple of Artemis Agrotera and Apollo Agraeus. He also restored the walls of Megara, which had been destroyed by the Cretans. In this work he was said to have been assisted by Apollo, and the stone upon which the god used to place his lyre while he was at work, was even in late times believed to produce a sound similar to that of a lyre when struck.

Echepolis, one of the sons of Alcathous, was killed during the Calydonian hunt in Aetolia, and when his brother Callipolis hastened to carry the sad tidings to his father, he found him engaged in offering a sacrifice to Apollo, and thinking it unfit to offer sacrifices at such a moment, he snatched away the wood from the altar. Alcathous, imagining this to be an act of deliberate sacrilege, killed his son on the spot with a piece of wood. The acropolis of Megara was called by a name derived from that of Alcathous.

Alcathous was grandfather of the hero Ajax, via his daughter Periboea, who married Telamon, and of Iolaus, nephew and charioteer of Heracles, by his other daughter Automedusa.

== Cult ==
Alcathous became the eponym of the acropolis located in the western part of ancient Megara. A cult of him existed in the city, and in particular games called the Alcathoa were celebrated there (their name is attested only in a single source—in the scholia to the odes of Pindar). In the historical period, the sanctuary of Alcathous was used as an archive. Even in the 2nd century CE, travellers were shown the altar of the gods Prodomeis (“Founders”), on which Alcathous had offered sacrifices before beginning the construction of the city wall; the funerary monument of Callipolis, killed by Alcathous; and the temple of Apollo and Artemis built by Alcathous.

Some scholars see in Alcathous a kind of counterpart to Heracles: both heroes, in their youth, defeated lions. The marriage of Alcathous’ daughter to Telamon may have served as an ideological justification for Megarian dominance over the island of Salamis, of which Telamon was considered king. When the island later passed to Athens, Periboea began to be regarded as an Athenian.

== Legacy ==
The Alcathoea (ἀλκαθοῖα) were games celebrated in Megara in honor of Alcathous.
