= Palaemon (mythology) =

Greek mythological figures

In Greek mythology, Palaemon or Palaimon (Ancient Greek: Παλαίμων means 'wrestler') may refer to the following personages:

- Palaemon, the name that Melicertes, son of Athamas and Ino, received upon deification.
- Palaemon or Palaemonius, a Calydonian or Olenian Argonaut, son of either Hephaestus, Aetolus or Lernus. Since he was the son of the crippled god of smiths, Palaemon had also crippled feet but no one among his comrades would dare to scorn his bodily frame and his valour.
- Palaemon, son of Heracles by either Autonoe, daughter of Pireus, or Iphinoe, daughter of Antaeus and Tinjis; hence a rare epithet of Heracles himself as "the Wrestler"
- Palaemon, a warrior in the army of the Seven Against Thebes who saw a chasm open in the earth and swallow Amphiaraus.
- Palaemon, a Trojan prince as son of King Priam of Troy.
- Palaemon, a character in Virgil's third Eclogue
