= Cleisithyra =

Daughter of Idomeneus and Meda in Greek myth

Cleisithyra is the daughter of Meda and King Idomeneus of Crete in Greek mythology. Her father was a son of Deucalion, who was a son of Minos, therefore Cleisithyra was the great-great-granddaughter of Zeus. She is also a foster sibling to Leucus, who her parents took in.

== Mythology ==
When King Idomeneus left to fight in the Trojan War, he left his kingdom to Leucus, son of the bronze giant Talos of Crete, and Idomeneus' foster son. Idomeneus promised to give Cleisithyra to Leucus upon his return. While Idomeneus was gone, Leucus tried to kill both Cleisithyra and her mother, Meda, in hopes of stealing the kingdom from Idomeneus, as Nauplios convinced him he would be able to. Both of the women took refuge in a temple, but Leucus found them and killed them both, and then took over the kingdom.
