= Pireus (mythology) =

In Greek mythology, Pireus or Peireus (Ancient Greek: Πειρέως) or was the father of Autonoe who became the mother of Palaemon by the hero Heracles.
