= Agrotera =

Ancient Greek mythological epithet

Agrotera (Ancient Greek: Ἀγροτέρα, "the huntress") was an epithet of the Greek goddess Artemis, the most important goddess to Attic hunters.

At Agrae on the Ilissos, where she was believed to have first hunted after her arrival from Delos, Artemis Agrotera had a temple, dating to the 5th century BC, with a statue carrying a bow. During the Boedromia, on the seventh day of Boedromion (roughly, the beginning of September), an armed procession would take 600 goats to this temple, where they would all be sacrificed by the polemarch in honor of the victory at the Battle of Marathon. This rite derived from a vow made before the Battle of Marathon, which in turn derived from the custom of making a "slaughter sacrifice", or sphagion (σφάγιον), to Artemis Agrotera before a battle. The temple was destroyed in 1778, when the Ottoman forces occupying Athens set about demolishing ancient sites for building material to construct a wall around the city. The ruins of the temple survive today on Ardettou Street, tightly surrounded by modern buildings. There is an ongoing campaign for the expropriation of adjacent buildings and the restoration of the temple.

Under this name Agrotera was also worshiped at Aigeira, Sparta, and elsewhere. The name Agrotera is synonymous with the epithet Agraea, but Eustathius derives it from the town of Agrae.

The epithet Agrotera was also sometimes applied to the nymph Cyrene.
