= Megareus (son of Poseidon) =

In Greek mythology, Megareus (Ancient Greek: Μεγαρέας or Μεγαρέως), also called Megarus (Μέγαρος), was king of Onchestus in Boeotia. In some myths, he was the eponymous king of Megara.

== Family ==
Megareus was either son of Poseidon and Oenope, daughter of Epopeus, or of Onchestus (eponym of their kingdom), or of Apollo or of Aegeus, or of Hippomenes.

== Mythology ==
Megareus came with his army to the assistance of Nisos, husband of his sister Abrota, against Minos. In one version, he died in the battle, and the city of Nisa (Nisos' domain) was renamed Megara in his honor; in another, he married Iphinoe, daughter of Nisos, and succeeded to his father-in-law's power over Megara. His children by Iphinoe were Evippus, Timalcus, and Evaechme; he also had a son Hippomenes by Merope. With the aid of the god Apollo, Alcathous killed the Cithaeronian lion, for which Megareus gave him his daughter Euaechme as wife. He subsequently made Alcathous his successor, because his own sons did not outlive him: Evippus was killed by the lion, and Timalcus was slain by Theseus, having joined the Dioscuri in the campaign against him.
