= Periboea (daughter of Alcathous) =

Princess in Greek mythology

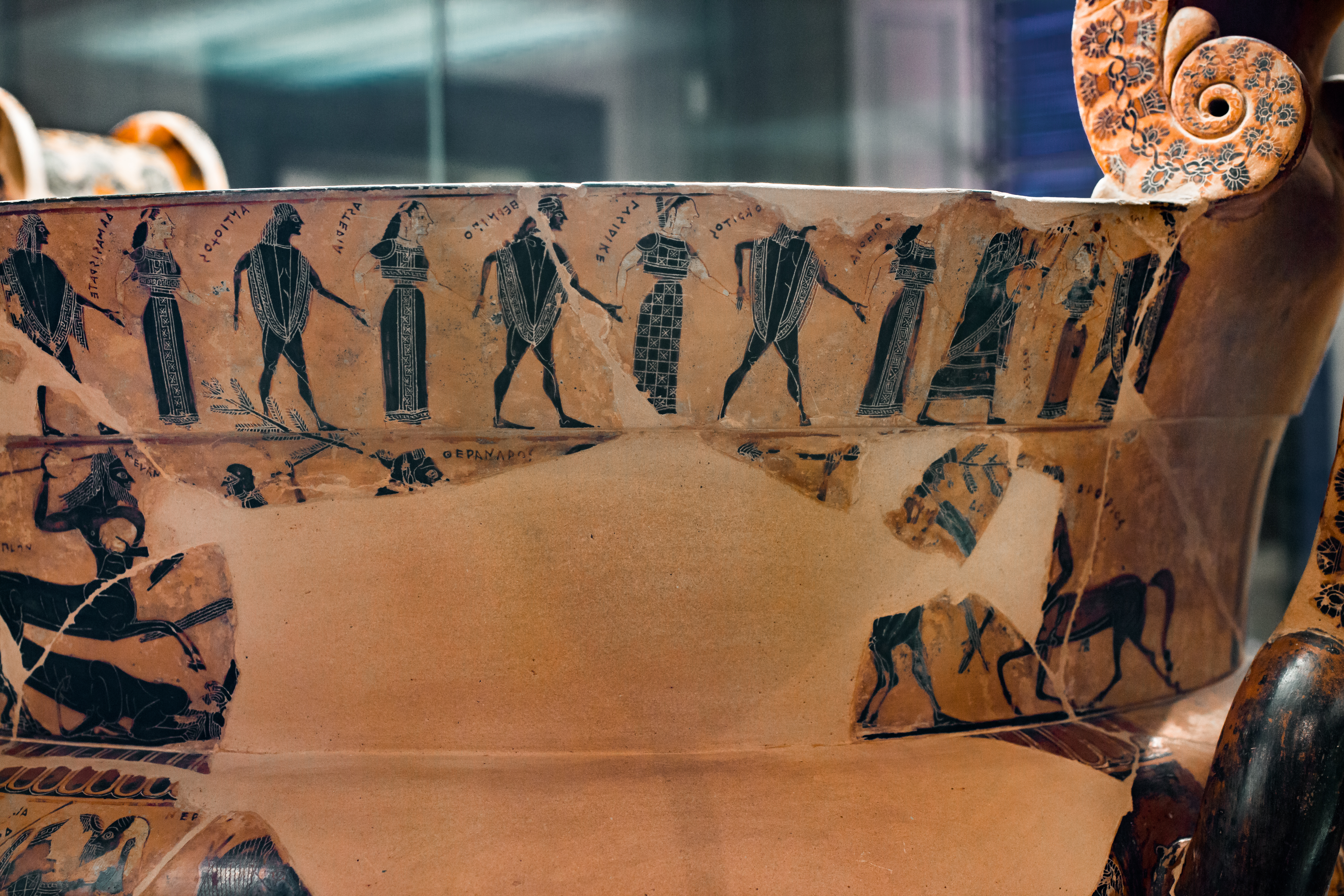
Eriboea (far left) with Theseus and Ariadne on the François Vase, c. 570 BC, Florence.

In Greek mythology, Periboea (/ˌpɛrɪˈbiːə/; Ancient Greek: Περίβοια, romanized: Períboia, lit. 'surrounded by cattle'), also called Phereboea (Ancient Greek: Φερέβοια, romanized: Pheréboia) or Eriboea (Ancient Greek: Ἐρίβοια, romanized: Eríboia), is an Attic princess and the mother of Ajax the Great by Telamon. In her youth, she was chosen to be one of the sacrificial victims of the Minotaur, but she was saved when Theseus slew him.

== Family ==
Periboea was the daughter of Alcathous, one of the sons of Pelops and king of Megara; by Telamon she became the mother of Ajax. Some authors on the other hand wrote that Periboea/Phereboea became the wife of Theseus.

== Mythology ==
=== Minotaur ===
Periboea was one of the several youths chosen to become the victims of the Minotaur because the Megarians paid tribute to the Athenians; it was the same year that Theseus joined the doomed youths in order to put an end to the sacrifices. While they were travelling by ship for Crete, Periboea's beauty caused King Minos to take a fancy in her and touch her inappropriately. But she called out Theseus to defend her and Minos' advances were thus thwarted. Later Theseus slew the Minotaur, and Periboea along with the rest were saved and returned to their homelands.

=== Later life ===
Years later, Periboea married Telamon of Salamis. According to a pseudo-Plutarchic text, Telamon once visited Alcathous and in his halls he ravished Periboea; afterwards he fled during the night. Alcathous suspected one of the citizens had debauched his daughter, and delivered her to a guard with the order to cast her into the sea. The man pitied her, and instead sold her. She was brought to Salamis where Telamon bought her. In time she bore to him a son, Ajax.

== See also ==
Other Greek mythological princesses punished for promiscuity include:

- Aerope
- Antiope
- Alope

== Bibliography ==
- Apollodorus, The Library, with an English Translation by Sir James George Frazer, F.B.A., F.R.S. in 2 Volumes. Cambridge, MA, Harvard University Press; London, William Heinemann Ltd. 1921. Online version at the Perseus Digital Library.
- Bacchylides, Odes Translated by Diane Arnson Svarlien. 1991. Online version at the Perseus Digital Library.
- Diodorus Siculus, Library of History, Volume III: Books 4.59-8, translated by C. H. Oldfather, Loeb Classical Library No. 340. Cambridge, Massachusetts, Harvard University Press, 1939. Available online at Topos Text.
- Fowler, Robert Louis (2000). Early Greek Mythography: Texts. Oxford University Press. ISBN 0-19-814740-6.
- Grimal, Pierre (1987). The Dictionary of Classical Mythology. Wiley-Blackwell. ISBN 0-631-13209-0.
- Pausanias, Description of Greece with an English Translation by W.H.S. Jones, Litt.D., and H.A. Ormerod, M.A., in 4 Volumes. Cambridge, MA, Harvard University Press; London, William Heinemann Ltd. 1918. Online version at the Perseus Digital Library.
- Pindar, Odes, with an English translation by Diane Arnson Svarlien. 1990. Online version at the Perseus Digital Library.
- Plutarch, Life of Theseus in Parallel Lives, translated by Bernadotte Perrin. Loeb Classical Library 46. Cambridge, MA: Harvard University Press, 1914. Available online on Bill Thayer's site.
- Plutarch, pseudo-, Parallela Minora in The Moralia, with an English Translation by Frank Cole Babbitt. Cambridge, MA. Harvard University Press. London. William Heinemann Ltd. 1936. 4. Online version at Topos Text.
- Xenophon, On Hunting in Scripta Minora, translated by E. C. Marchant, G. W. Bowersock. Loeb Classical Library 183. Cambridge, MA: Harvard University Press, 1925. Available online at Loeb Classical Library.
