= Onchestos =

Greek town in ancient Boeotia northwest of Thebes

- Ογχηστός (Greek)
- Location within Greece
- 38°21′54″N 23°08′49″E
- Type: City
- Periods: Ancient Greece / Rome
- Location: Boeotia
- Region: Greece

Onchestos or Onchestus (Greek: Ογχηστός) was a Greek town in ancient Boeotia northwest of Thebes. In ancient times it was famous for its sanctuary of Poseidon. The site has been excavated intermittently since the 1960s. It was in the territory of Haliartus, said to have been founded by Onchestos, a son of Poseidon.

== History ==
Onchestos is mentioned in the famous "Catalogue of Ships" in Homer's Iliad where it is referred to as Poseidon’s "bright grove." The town was a meeting place for the Boeotian League in the Macedonian period. The town was burned by the Persians under Xerxes I, and probably again by the Romans in 171 BC when nearby Haliartus was destroyed. In the early 1st century AD Strabo wrote that the temple was standing although Poseidon's sacred grove was "devoid of trees". In the 2nd century Pausanias wrote that he was still able to see Poseidon’s temple, cult image, and grove.

== Archaeology ==
Its site is located near modern Steni. Sporadic archaeological excavations have taken place at the site from the 1960s onwards. Since 2014 a new Onchestos Excavation Project has begun to systematically examine the site. The excavations attest to sanctuary’s prosperity in the 6th and 5th centuries BC.
