= Pandora (mythology) =

Name of two women in Greek mythology

In Greek mythology, Pandora (Ancient Greek: Πανδώρα, derived from πᾶν, pān, i.e. "all" and δῶρον, dōron, i.e. "gift", thus "the all-endowed", "all-gifted" or "all-giving") was the name of the following women:

- Pandora, first human woman created by the gods.
- Pandora, daughter of Deucalion and Pyrrha, and thus, granddaughter of the above figure.
- Pandora, an Athenian princess as the second eldest daughter of King Erechtheus of Athens and probably Praxithea, daughter of Phrasimus and Diogeneia. Together with her sister Protogeneia, they sacrificed herself on behalf of their country when an army came from Boeotia during the war between Athens and Eleusis. Pandora's other sisters were Procris, Creusa, Oreithyia, Chthonia, and Merope while her possible brothers were Cecrops, Pandorus, Metion, Orneus, Thespius, Eupalamus and Sicyon.

== See also ==
- Pandora's box
