= Chthonia =

Set of mythological Greek characters

In Greek mythology, the name Chthonia (Ancient Greek: Χθονία, lit. 'of the earth' or 'subterranean') may refer to:

- Chthonia, an Athenian princess and the youngest daughter of King Erechtheus and Praxithea, daughter of Phrasimus and Diogeneia. She was sacrificed by her father who had received a prophecy according to which he could win the imminent battle against Eumolpus only if he sacrificed his daughter. Her sisters who had sworn to kill themselves if one of them died, fulfilled their oath by throwing themselves off a cliff. According to the dictionary Suda, only two of the sisters, Protogeneia and Pandora, did commit suicide which made sense, since of the other daughters of Erechtheus, Orithyia had been abducted by Boreas, Procris married off to Cephalus, and Creusa was still a baby at the time the oath had been sworn. It was also said, however, that Chthonia married her uncle Butes, which probably indicated a version that she was not sacrificed. Her other siblings were Cecrops, Pandorus and Metion, and possibly Merope, Orneus, Thespius, Eupalamus and Sicyon.
- Chthonia, daughter of Phoroneus or of Colontas. She and her brother Clymenus were said to have founded a sanctuary of Demeter Chthonia (see below) at Hermione. In another version, Demeter, during her wanderings in search of Persephone, was ill-treated by Colontas, against which Chthonia protested. Demeter burned Colontas alive in his house, but saved Chthonia and transported her to Hermione, where she founded the aforementioned sanctuary.
- Chthonia or Phthonia (Phosthonia) one of the Alcyonides, daughters of the giant Alcyoneus. She was the sister of Alkippe, Anthe, Asteria, Drimo, Methone and Pallene. When their father Alcyoneus was slain by Heracles, these girls threw themselves into the sea from Kanastraion, which is the peak of Pellene. They were then transformed into halcyons (kingfishers) by the goddess Amphitrite.
- Chthonia, an epithet of Demeter and several other chthonic deities, such as Hecate, Nyx or Melinoe.

Chthonia was also an ancient mythical and poetical name of Crete.
