= Pandorus =

Greek mythical figure

In Greek mythology, Pandorus or Pandoros (/ˌpænˈdɔːrəs/; Ancient Greek: Πάνδωρος, romanized: Pándōros, lit. 'all-giving', 'plentiful' or 'giver of all') may refer to the following personages:

- Pandorus, son of Zeus and Pandora, daughter of Deucalion and Pyrrha. He was the brother of Melera, and possibly Graecus and Latinus.
- Pandorus, an Athenian prince as the son of King Erechtheus of Athens and Praxithea, daughter of Phrasimus and Diogeneia. He was the brother of Metion, Cecrops, Protogeneia, Pandora, Procris, Creusa, Oreithyia and Chthonia. Pandorus' possible siblings were Orneus, Thespius, Eupalamus, Sicyon and Merope. After leaving Attica, he founded the city of Chalcis in Euboea.
