= Orneus =

In Greek mythology, Orneus (/ˈɔːrnˌjuːs/; Ancient Greek: Ὀρνεύς, lit. 'of a bird' or 'bird-like') may refer to two different personages:

- Orneus, an Athenian prince as the son of King Erechtheus and probably Praxithea, daughter of Phrasimus and Diogeneia. His possible siblings were Protogeneia, Pandora, Creusa, Procris, Oreithyia, Chthonia, Merope, Cecrops, Pandorus, Metion, Thespius, Eupalamus and Sicyon. Orneus was the father of Peteus and through the latter became the grandfather of Menestheus, successor of Theseus. The town of Orneae is believed to be named after him. Otherwise, the eponym of the land was attributed to the naiad Ornea, daughter of the river-god Asopus and Metope.
- Orneus, one of the centaurs who attended Pirithous' wedding. He fought against the Lapiths and fled.
