= Orithyia (daughter of Erechtheus) =

Legendary princess of Athens

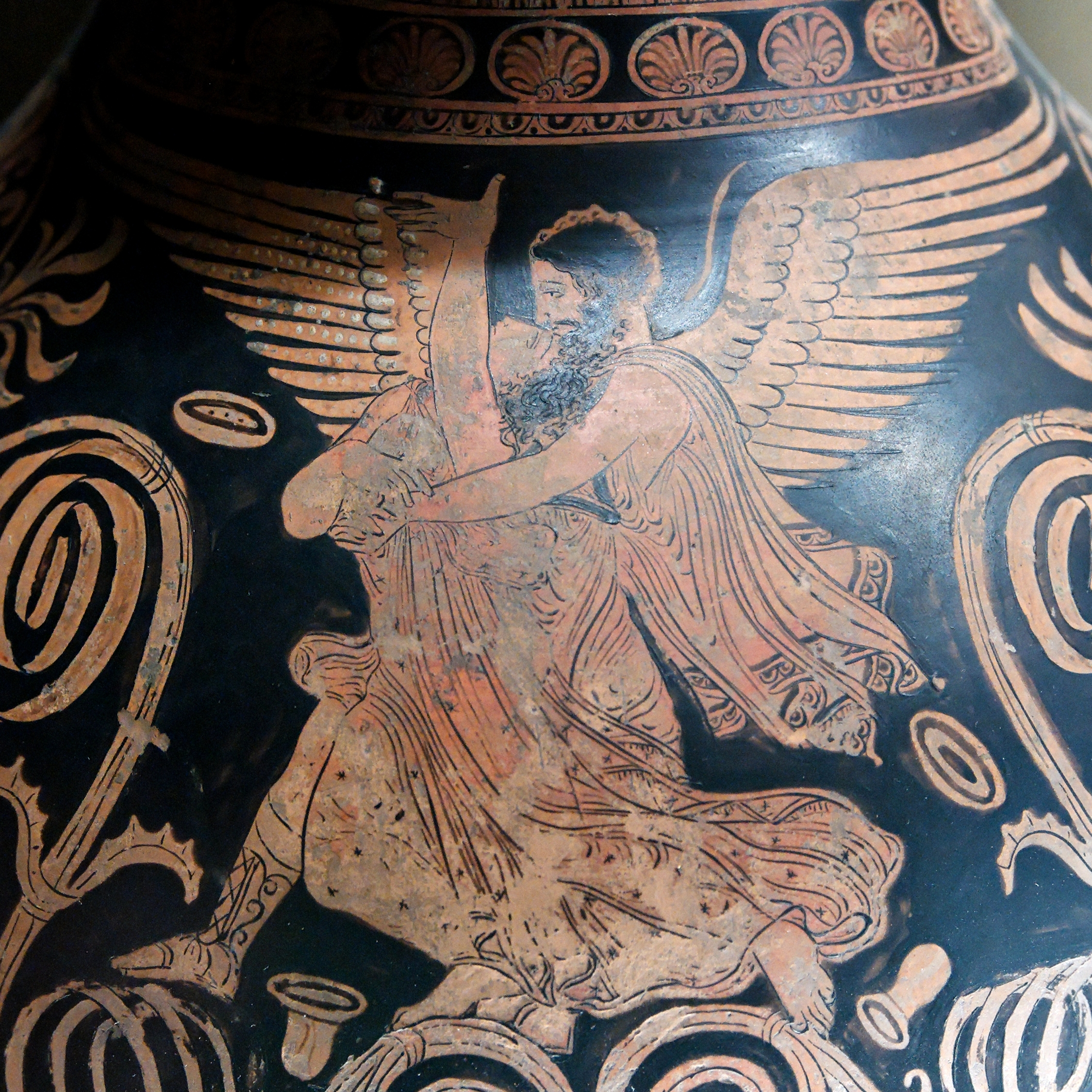
Boreas & Oreithyia Louvre

In Greek mythology, Orithyia or Oreithyia (/ɒrɪˈθaɪ.ə/; Ancient Greek: Ὠρείθυια, romanized: Ōreíthyia; Latin: Ōrīthyia; lit. 'mountain-raging' or 'mountain-rushing') was an Athenian princess who was raped by Boreas, the north wind, and gave birth to the twin Boreads, Zetes and Calaïs.

== Family ==
Orithyia was the fifth daughter of King Erechtheus of Athens and his wife, Praxithea, daughter of Phrasimus and Diogeneia. She was sister to Cecrops, Pandorus, Metion, Protogeneia, Pandora, Procris, Creusa, and Chthonia. Her other possible siblings were Merope, Orneus, Thespius, Eupalamus and Sicyon.

Orithyia gave Boreas two daughters, Chione and Cleopatra (the wife of Phineus) and two sons, Calais and Zetes, both known as the Boreads. These sons grew wings like their father and joined the Argonauts in the quest for the Golden Fleece.

== Legends ==
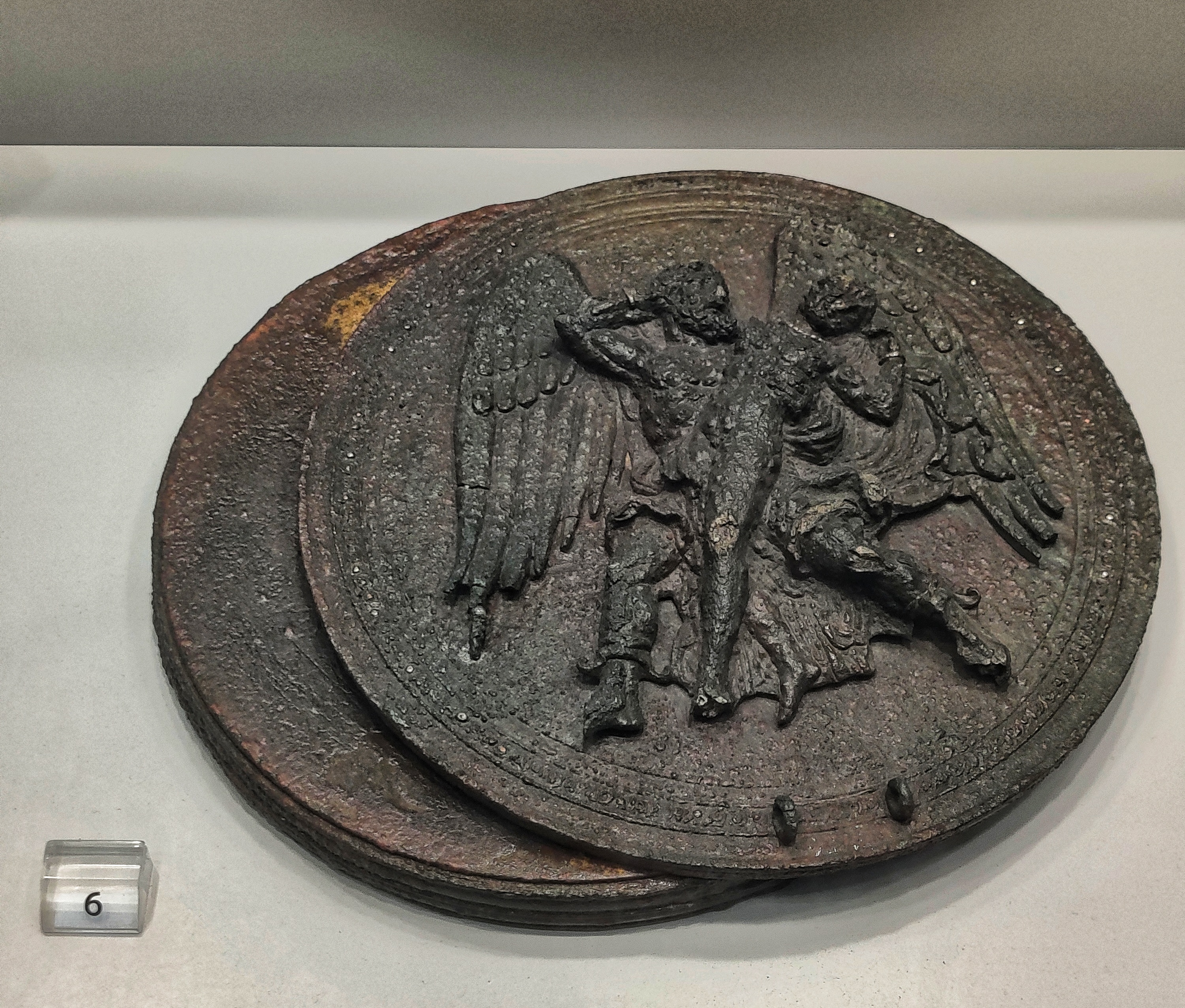
Folding mirror depicting the abduction of Orithyia by Boreas at the cover. Post 300 BC, found in Eretria at Euboea. National Archaeological Museum, Athens

Boreas, the north wind, fell in love with Orithyia. At first he attempted to woo her, but after failing at that he decided to take her by force, as violence felt more natural to him. While she was playing by the Ilissos River, Orithyia was carried off to Sarpedon's Rock, near the Erginos River in Thrace. There she was wrapped in a cloud and attacked. Aeschylus wrote a satyr play about the abduction called Orithyia which has been lost.

Plato wrote somewhat mockingly that there may have been a rational explanation for her story. She may have been killed on the rocks of the river when a gust of northern wind came, and so she was said to have been 'taken by Boreas'. He also mentioned in another account that she was taken by Boreas not along the Ilissos, but from the Areopagus, a rock outcropping near the Acropolis where murderers were tried. However, many scholars regard this as a later gloss.

Plato also recounted that Orithyia was playing with a companion nymph Pharmacea.

Because she was in Thrace with Boreas, she did not die when her sisters who either committed suicide or were sacrificed so that Athens could win a war against Eleusis.

In the Posthomerica of Quintus Smyrnaeus, she gave Penthesileia a very swift horse when she visited Thrace.

Orithyia was later made into the goddess of cold mountain winds. It is said that prior to the destruction of a large number of barbarian ships due to weather during the Persian War, the Athenians offered sacrifices to Boreas and Oreithyia, praying for their assistance.

== In art ==
- Boreas Abducting Orithyia (1640), red chalk drawing by Giovanni Maria Morandi, currently at the Museum Kunstpalast, Düsseldorf.
- The Abduction of Orithyia (18th century), painting by Francesco Solimena, currently at the National Art Museum of Azerbaijan, Baku.
- The Abduction of Orithyia (about 1730), painting in the style of Francesco Solimena, currently at the Walters Art Museum, Baltimore.
- The Rape of Orithyia by Boreas (1702), bronze sculpture by Giovanni Battista Foggini, currently at the Art Gallery of Ontario, Toronto.
- The Rape of Orithyia by Boreas (about 1745), porcelain from Doccia manufactory after Giovanni Battista Foggini, currently at the Art Institute of Chicago.
- Boreas Abducting Orithyia" (1614), Oil on Wood, by Peter Paul Rubens, currently at the Akademie der bildenden Künste, Vienna.
- https://www.wga.hu/frames-e.html?/html/r/rubens/21mythol/index.html

== Gallery ==
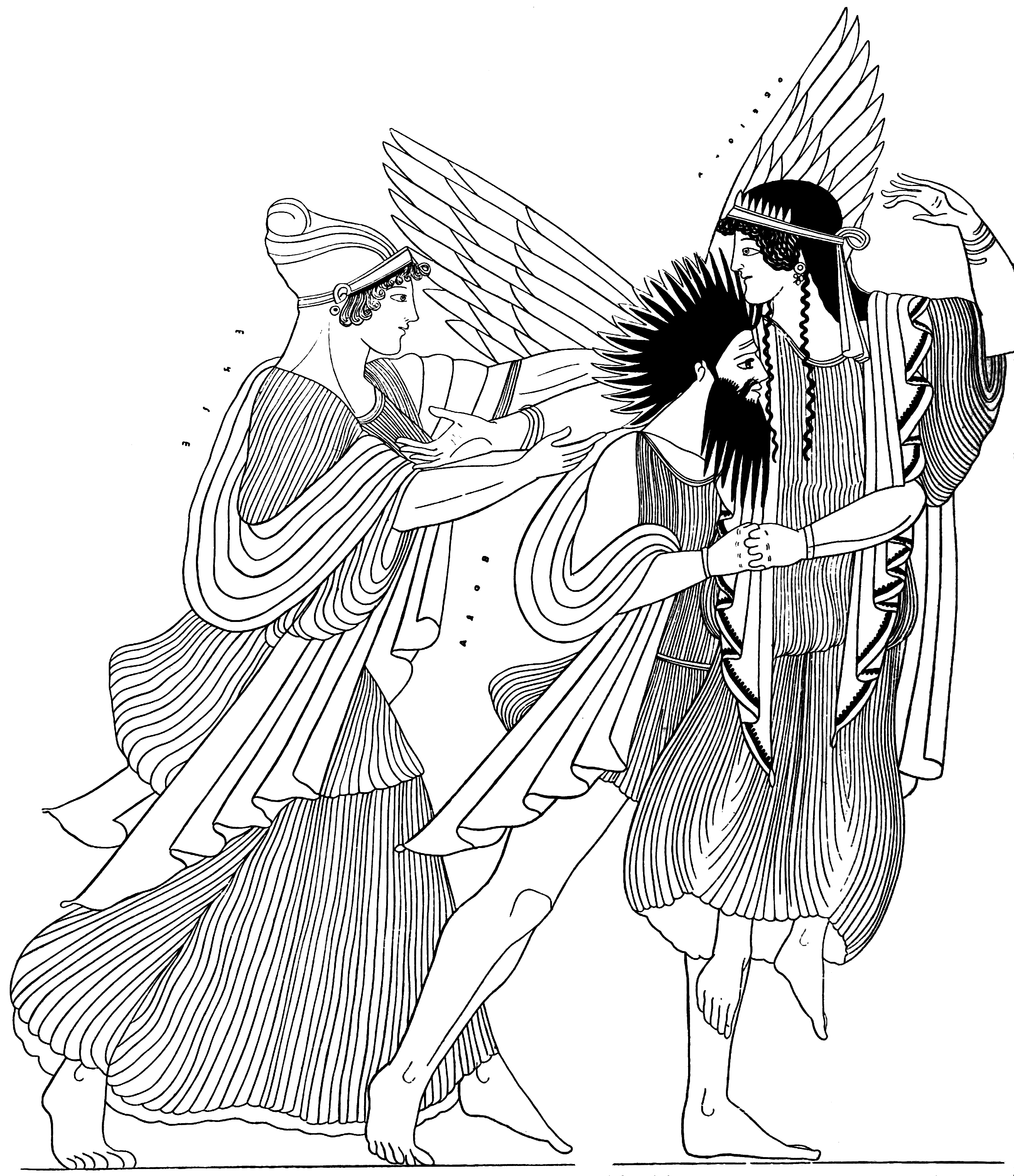
Boreas abducting Oreithyia (1885)

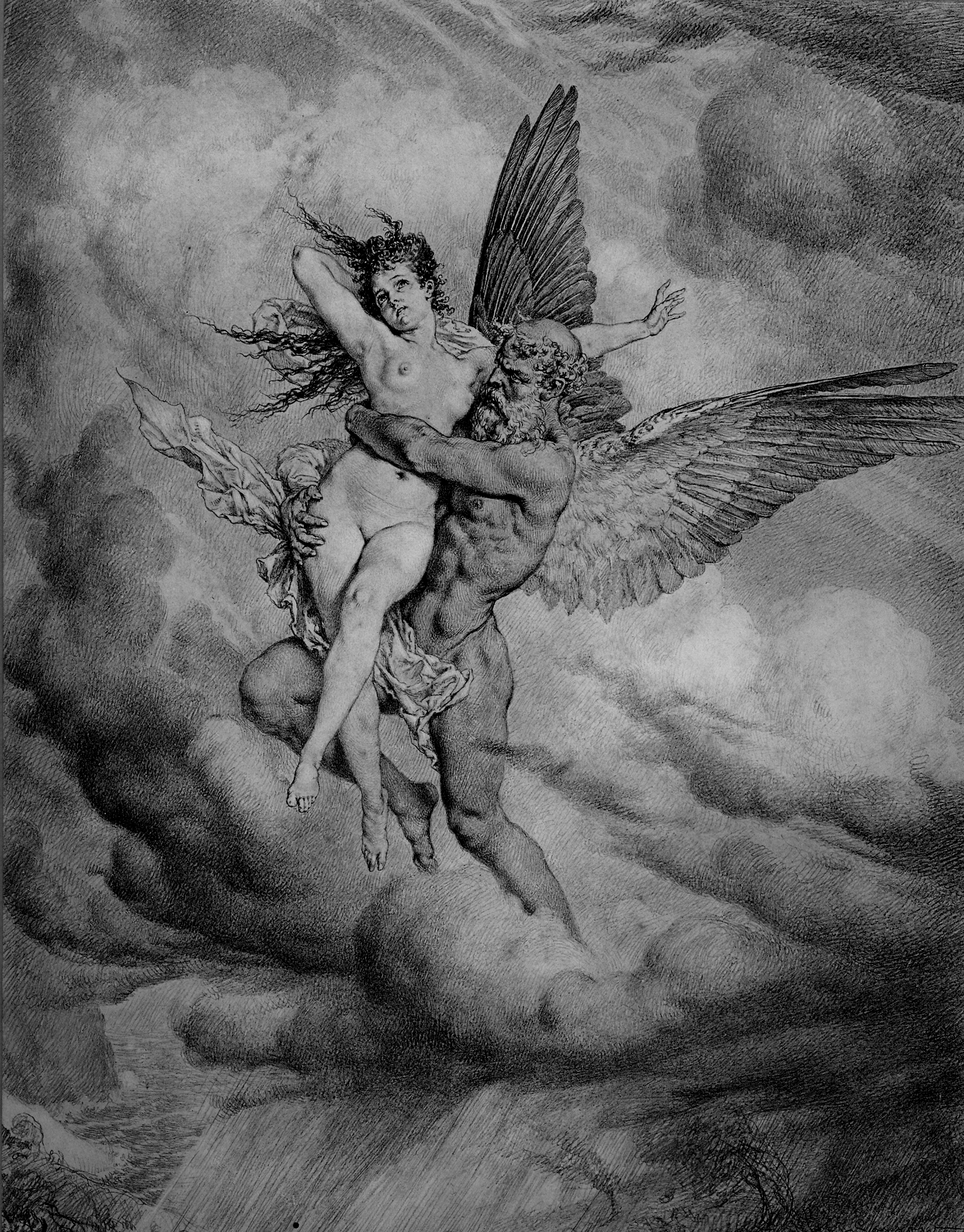
Boreas and Orithya, etching by the German painter and illustrator Heinrich Lossow (1840-1897)

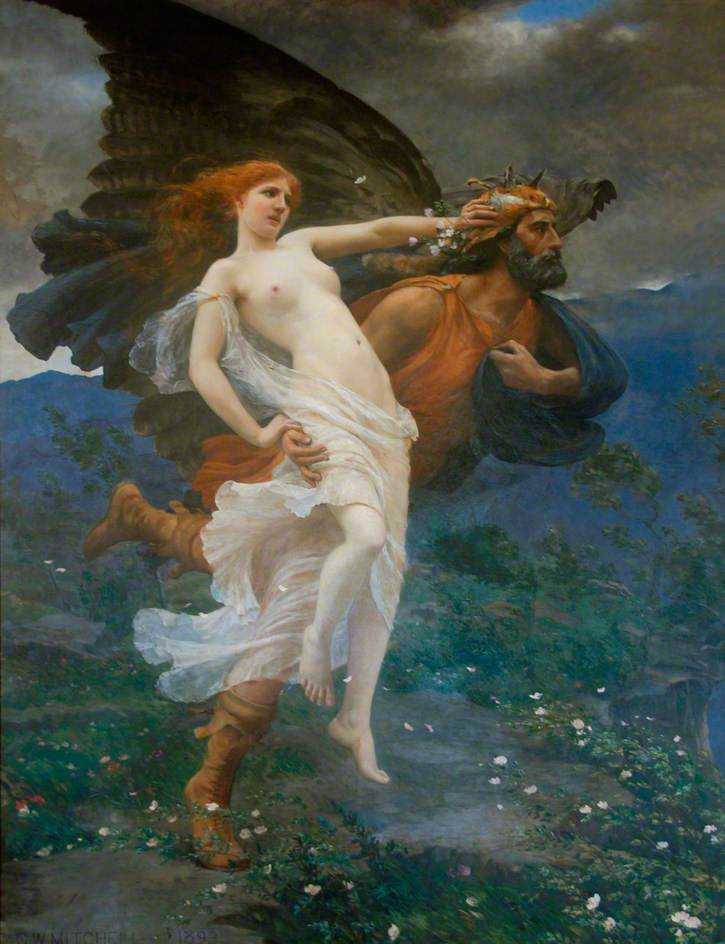
The flight of Boreas with Oreithyia by Charles William Mitchell (1893)

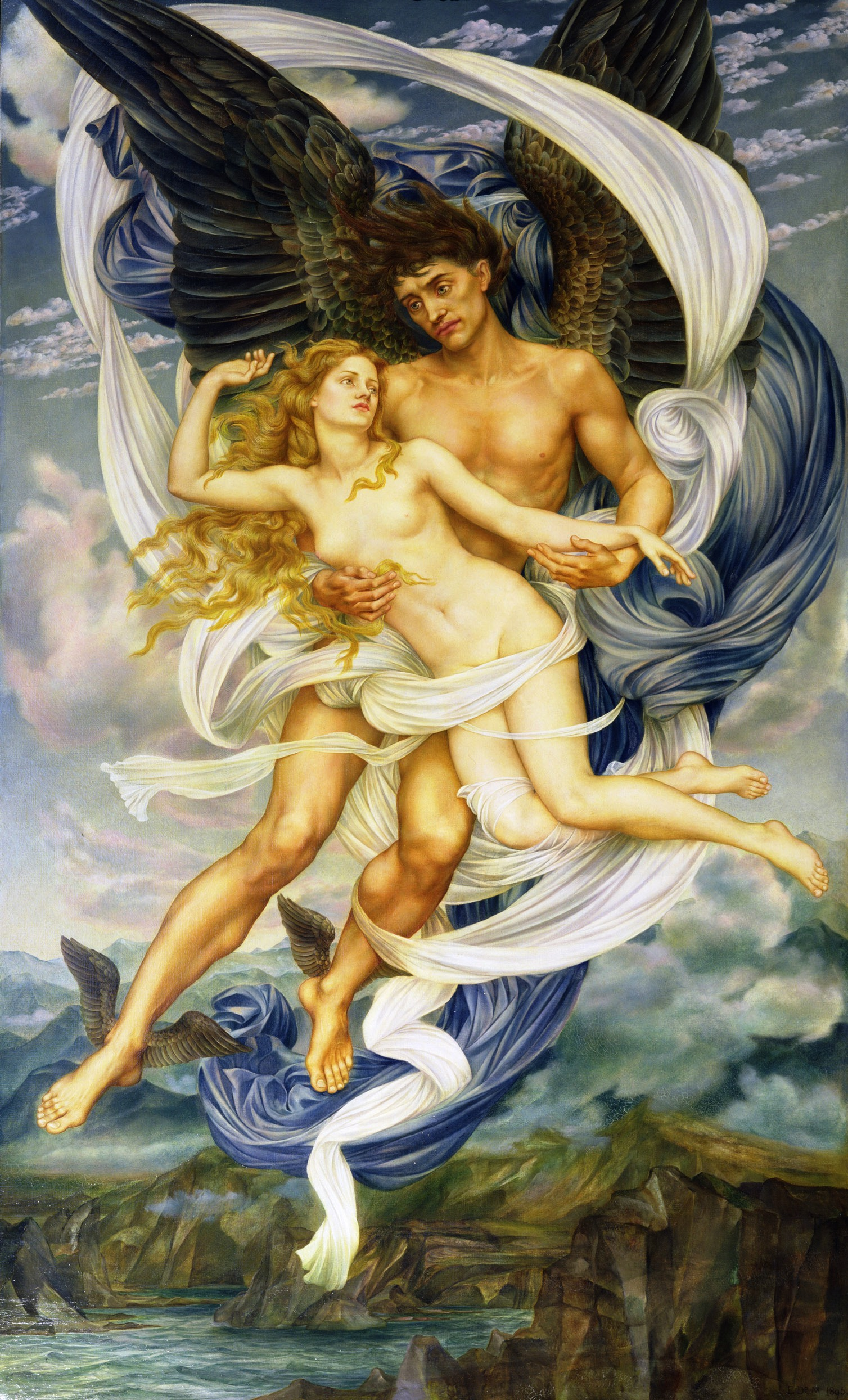
Boreas and Oreithyia by Evelyn de Morgan (1896)

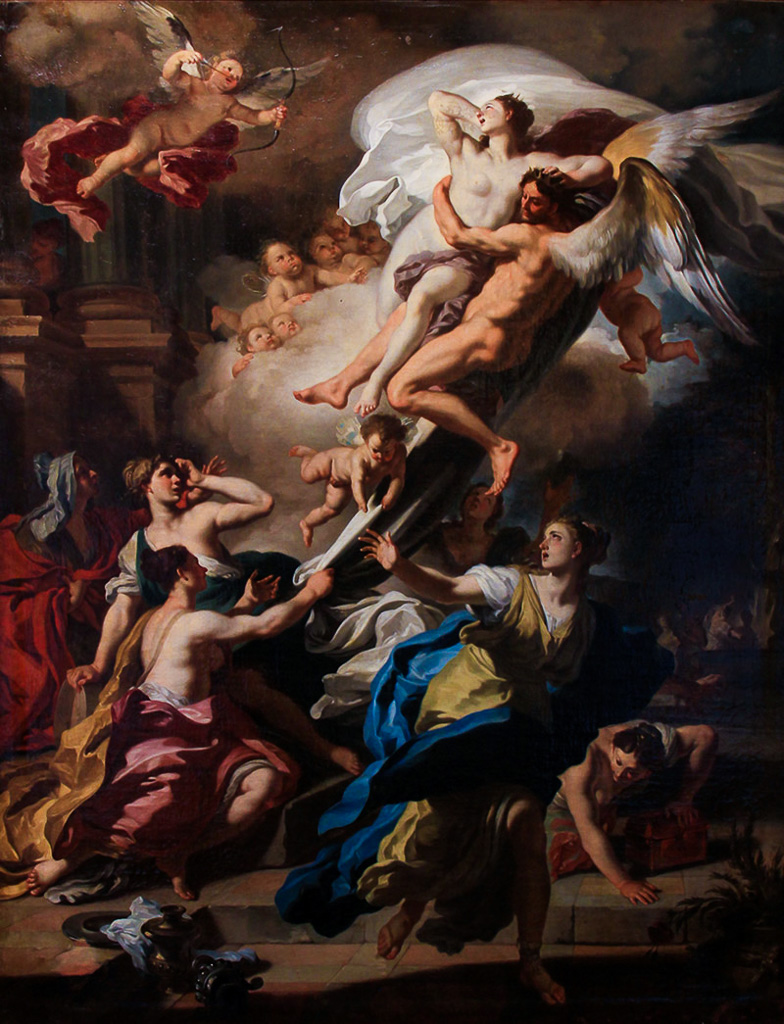
Boreas Abducting Oreithyia, Daughter of Erechteus by Francesco Solimena (1729)

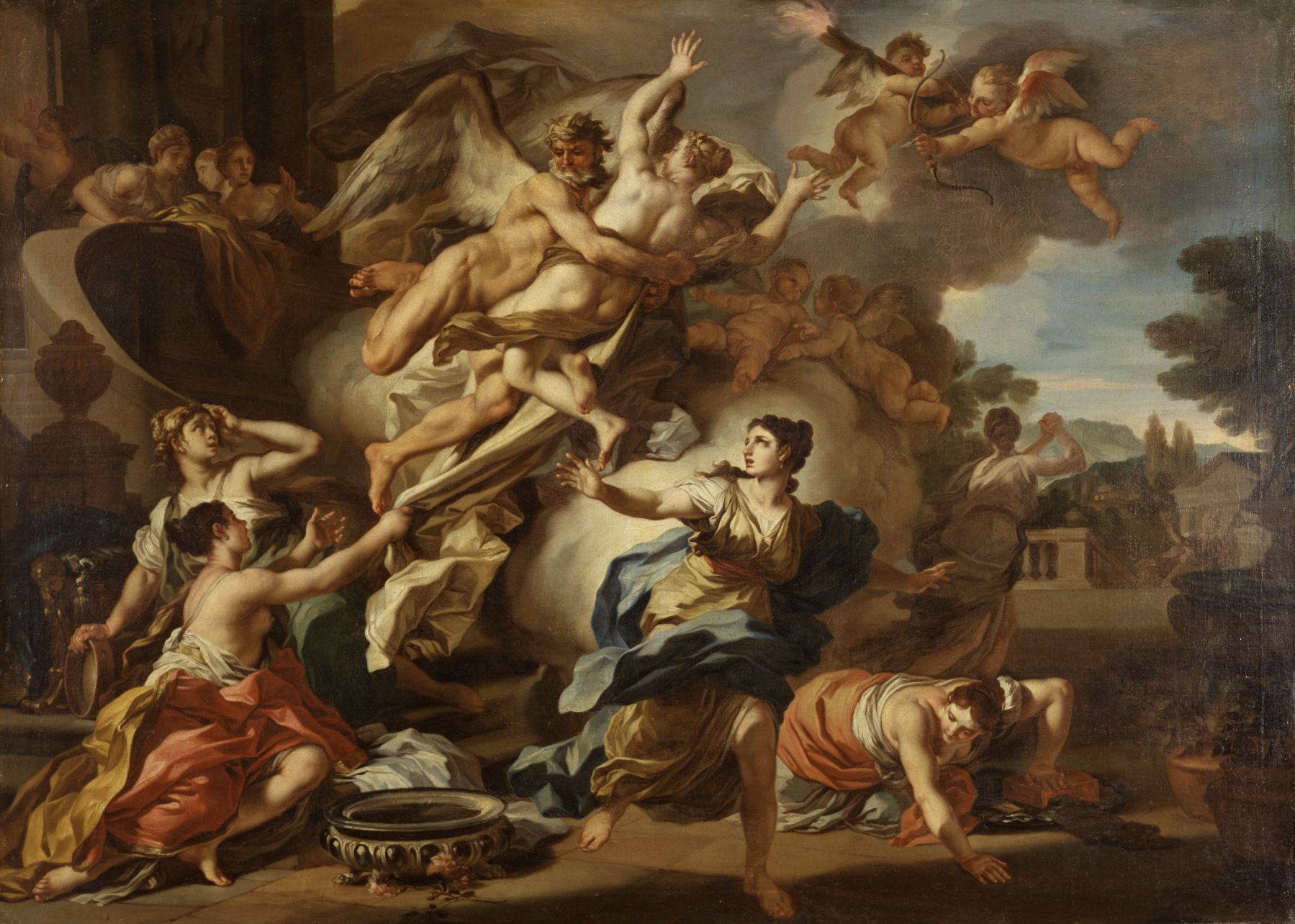
The Abduction of Orithyia by Francesco Solimena (circa 1730)

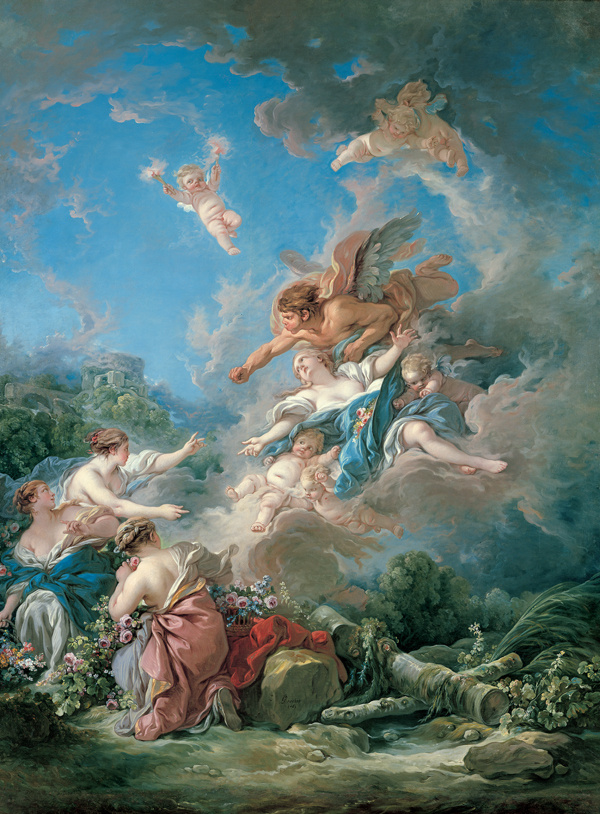
Boreas Abducting Oreithyia by François Boucher (1769)

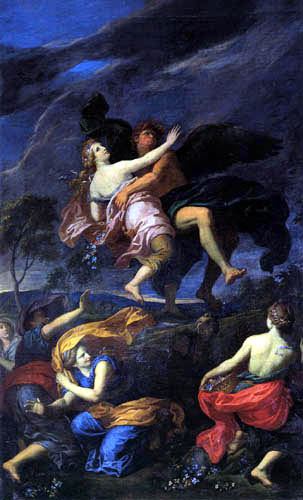
Boreas Abducting Oreithyia by François Verdier (1688)

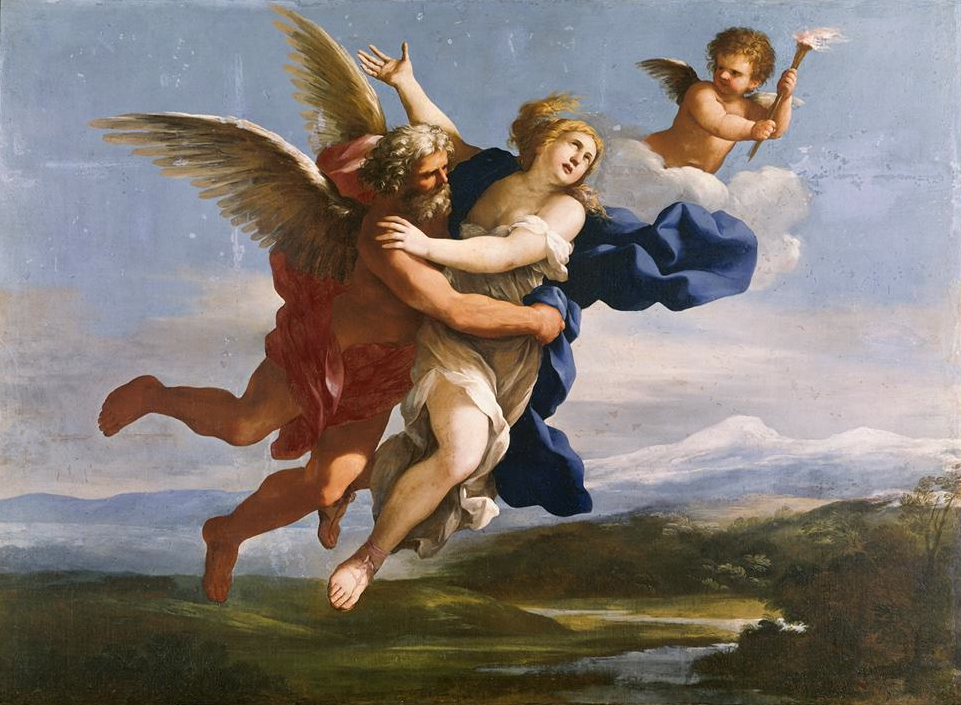
Boreas Abducting Oreithyia by Giovanni Francesco Romanelli (c. 17th)

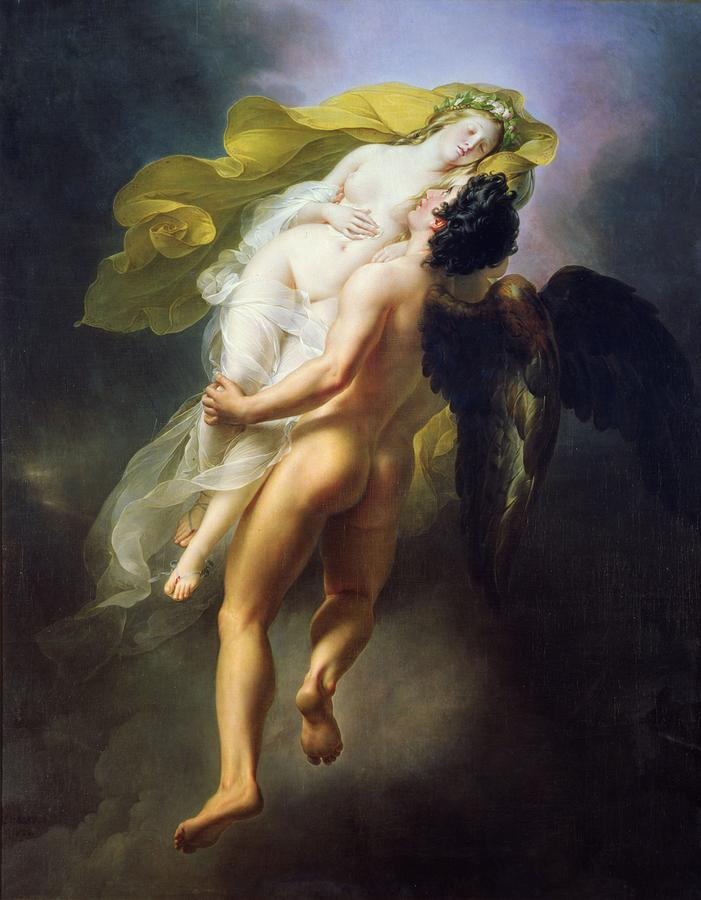
Boreas Abducting Oreithyia by Joseph-Ferdinand Lancrenon (1822)

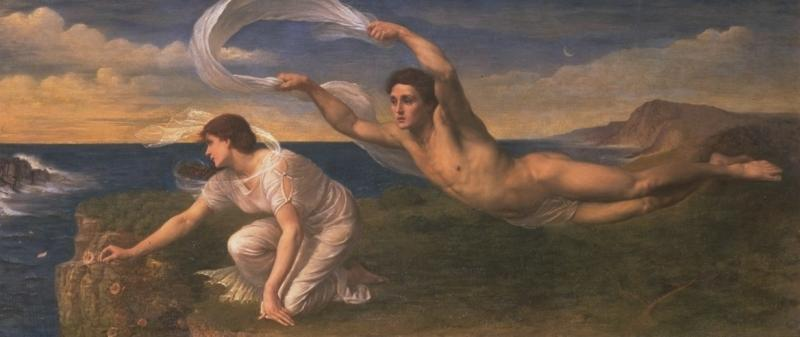
Boreas and Orithyia by Oswald von Glehn (1879)

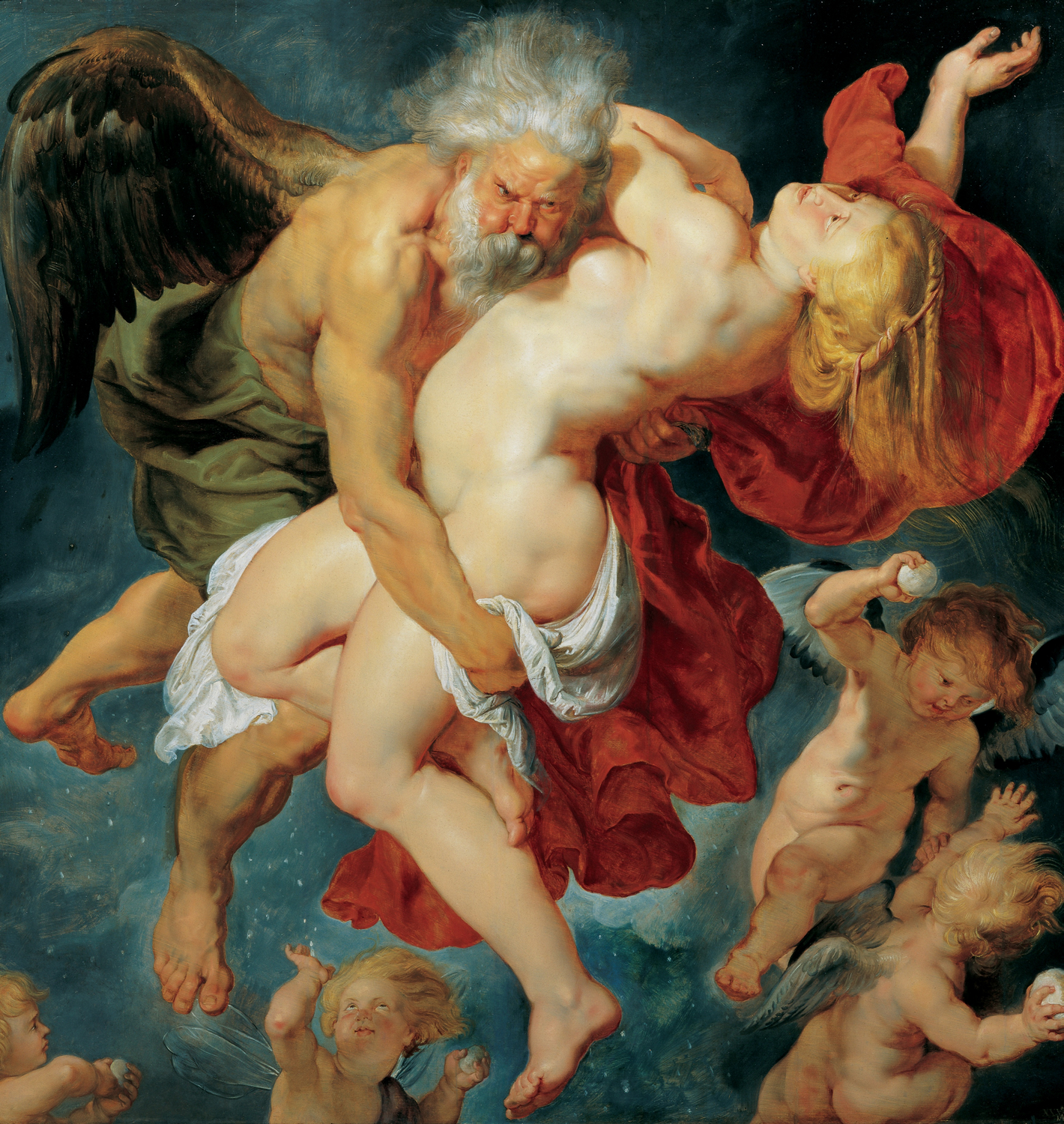
The Rape of Orithyia by Boreas by Peter Paul Rubens (circa 1620)

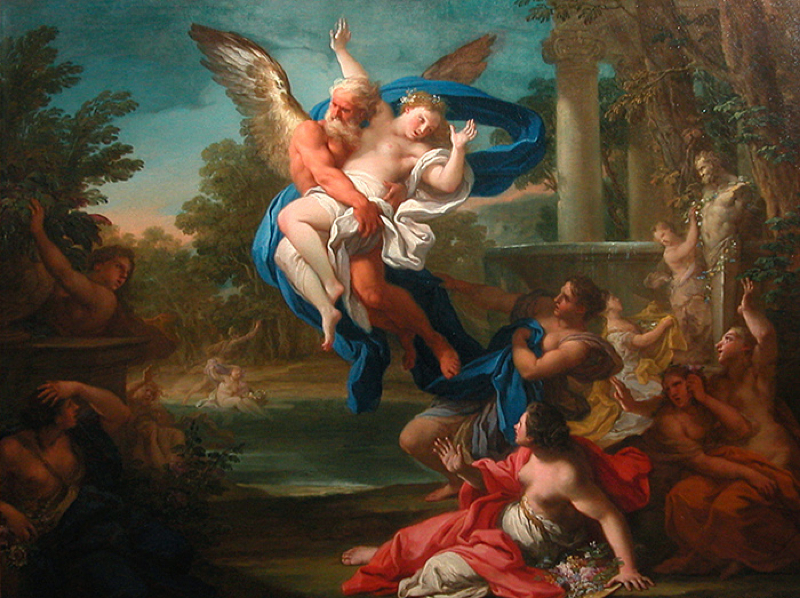
Boreas Abducting Oreithyia by Sebastiano Conca (18th century)
