= Creusa of Athens =

Legendary princess of Athens

In Greek mythology, Creusa (/kriˈuːsə/; Ancient Greek: Κρέουσα, romanized: Kréousa, lit. 'princess') was an Athenian princess.

== Family ==
Creusa was the youngest daughter of Erechtheus, King of Athens and his wife, Praxithea, daughter of Phrasimus and Diogeneia. She was the sister of Protogeneia, Pandora, Procris, Oreithyia, Chthonia, Cecrops, Pandorus and Metion. Her other possible siblings were Merope, Orneus, Thespius, Eupalamus and Sicyon.

Apollodorus mentions Creusa as the mother of Achaeus and Ion by her husband Xuthus; she is presumably also the mother of Xuthus' daughter Diomede. However, according to Euripides' Ion, in which she is a prominent character, Creusa was mother of Ion by Apollo, while Xuthus was infertile so he accepted Ion as his own son. Creusa is also mentioned as the mother of Ion with Apollo by Stephanus of Byzantium. Hyginus calls Creusa mother of Cephalus by Hermes.

== Mythology ==
Creusa was spared of the fate of her sisters because she was an infant at the time they had sworn to commit suicide if one of them died. According to the general tradition, Creusa had Ion, Achaeus and Dorus by Xuthus.

But in the play Ion, Creusa was dragged into a cave by Apollo, raped and impregnated by him long before her marriage to Xuthus. To protect her from her father's anger, Apollo used his powers to keep her pregnancy hidden. Creusa gave birth to her child without pain due to Apollo's intervention, but she left the baby in a cave because she feared her father's reproach. However, Apollo had Hermes bring his son, Ion, to his temple and made arrangements for him to be brought up there. Creusa, unaware of this went back to bring the child after feeling guilty. When she couldn't find the child, she assumed that the wild beasts had eaten the baby and went back grieving.

Years later, Xuthus went to consult the Delphian oracle about his marriage to Creusa being childless and met Ion, who had been raised at the temple of Apollo. The prophecy given by Apollo seemed to indicate Ion as his son, so Xuthus decided to adopt the youth. Creusa, unaware of her husband's infertility, thought that Ion's birth must have been the result of Xuthus' adultery in the past, and attempted to poison the young man, but Ion was in time to discover her conspiracy, and chased her to kill her. Creusa sought shelter at Apollo's altar and demanded not to kill her. Eventually, due to the intervention of Pythia who told to Ion that he was found abandoned and gave him the basket in which she had found him, Creusa realized that Ion was her son by Apollo she had abandoned, after Ion described to her the contents of the basket he had been found in as a baby. In the end of the play, Athena promised that Creusa and Xuthus would have two sons together, Achaeus and Dorus. The goddess then told them to keep all of this a secret from Xuthus.

== Culture ==
In 1754 the play Creusa, Queen of Athens by William Whitehead was produced at the Drury Lane Theatre in London.
