= Procris =

Greek mythological princess of Athens

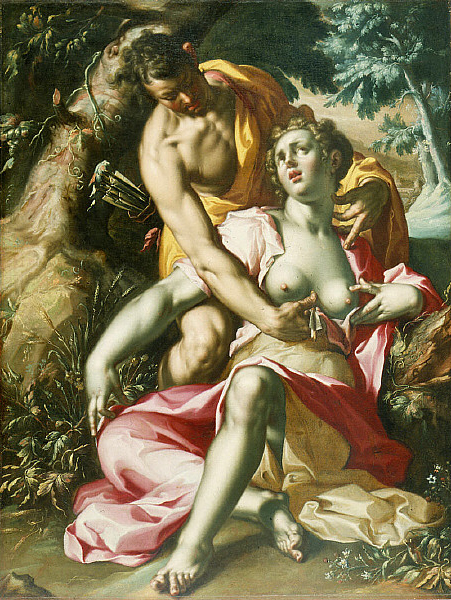
The Death of Procris by Joachim Wtewael (circa 1595–1600)

In Greek mythology, Procris /ˈproʊkrɪs/ (Ancient Greek: Πρόκρις, gen.: Πρόκριδος, romanized: Prókris, lit. 'dew' or 'morning dew') was an Athenian princess, the third daughter of Erechtheus, king of Athens and his wife, Praxithea. Homer mentions her in the Odyssey as one of the many dead spirits Odysseus saw in the Underworld. Sophocles wrote a tragedy called Procris that has been lost, as has a version contained in the Greek Cycle, but at least six different accounts of her story still exist.

== Family ==
Procris's sisters were Creusa, Oreithyia, Chthonia, Protogeneia, Pandora and Merope while her brothers were Cecrops, Pandorus, Metion, and possibly Orneus, Thespius, Eupalamus and Sicyon. She married Cephalus, the son of King Deioneus of Phocis.

== Mythology ==
=== Pherecydes ===
The earliest version of Procris' story comes from Pherecydes of Athens. Cephalus remains away from home for eight years because he wants to test Procris' fidelity. When he returns, he seduces her while disguised. Although they reconcile eventually, Procris suspects that her husband has a lover because he is often away hunting. A servant tells her that Cephalus called to Nephele (a cloud) to come to him. Procris follows him the next time he goes hunting and leaps out of the thicket when she hears him call out to Nephele again. He is startled and thinking that she is a wild animal, shoots her with an arrow and kills her.

=== Ovid ===
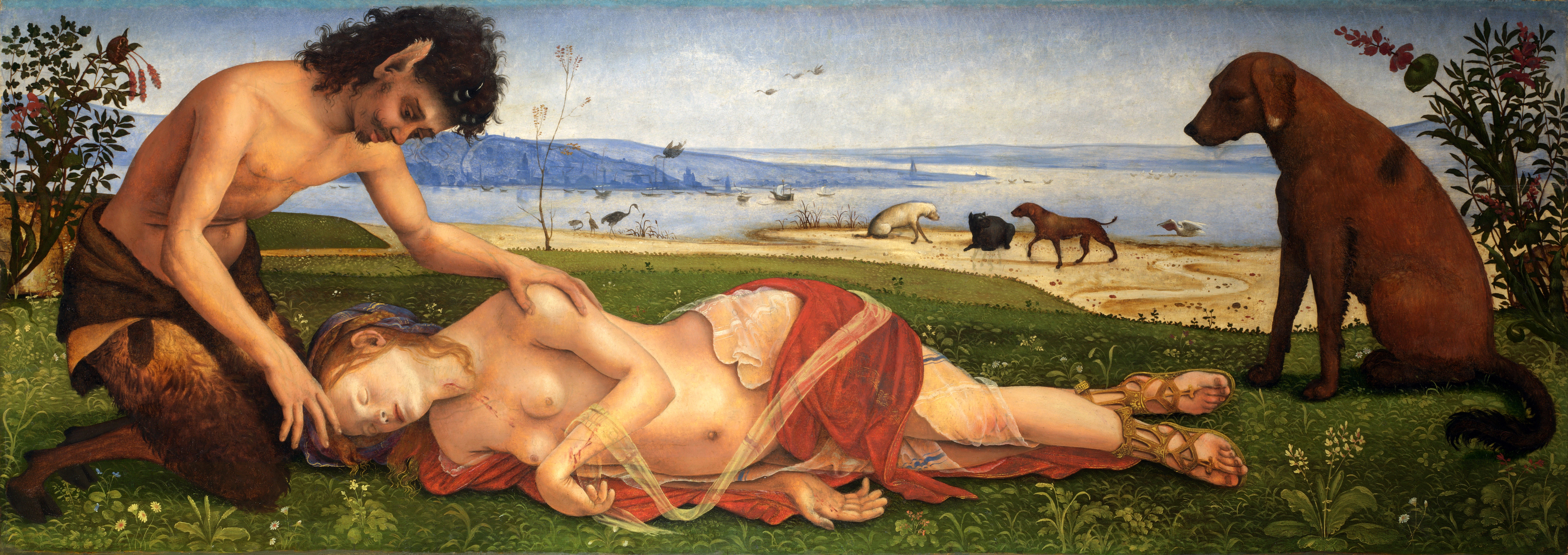
The Death of Procris, by Piero di Cosimo (c. 1486–1510)

==== Early version ====
Ovid tells the end of the story a bit differently in the third of his books on The Art of Love. No goddesses are mentioned in this earlier published work, a cautionary tale against credulity. After hunting, Cephalus calls for a breeze (Zephyr or Aura) to cool him as he lies in the shade.

Overhearing a comment to Procris, a busybody reports what he heard to Procris, who grew pale with terror that her husband loved another, and hastened in fury to the valley, then crept silently to the forest where Cephalus hunted. When she saw him flop on the grass to cool himself and call, to Zephyr to come relieve him, Procris realized that what she had taken to be the name of a lover was merely a name for the air and nothing more. Joyfully she rose to fling herself into his arms, but hearing a rustling of foliage, Cephalus shot an arrow at what he thought would be a wild beast in the brush. Dying, the woman laments that the breeze by whose name she was deceived would now carry away her spirit, and her husband weeps, holding her in his arms.

==== Late version ====
In Ovid's later account, the goddess of the dawn, Eos (Aurora to the Romans) seizes Cephalus while he is hunting, but Cephalus begins to pine for Procris. A disgruntled Eos returns Cephalus to his wife, but offers to show Cephalus how easily Procris would be seduced by another stranger. He therefore goes home in disguise. He pushes Procris to "hesitate" by promising her money before claiming that she is unfaithful. Procris flees to take up the pursuits of Diana, and is later persuaded to return to her husband, bringing him a magical spear and a hunting dog as gifts. Ovid emphasizes that Cephalus (who is the narrator of the events) dares not say how he acquired the dog and the javelin from Procris, hinting that Cephalus himself was seduced and tricked in the same manner as he did Procris, like in the versions Antoninus Liberalis and Hyginus related. The transformation scene centers on the dog, which always catches its quarry, and the uncatchable fox; Jupiter turns them into stone.

The tale resumes with a similar ending to that of Pherecydes, as Procris is informed of her husband's calling out to "Aura", the Latin word for breeze, which sounds similar to Eos' Roman equivalent Aurora. Cephalus kills her by accident when she stirs in the bushes nearby, upset at his beseeching of "beloved Aura" to "come into his lap and give relief to his heat". Procris dies in his arms after begging him not to let Aura take her place as his wife. He explains to her that it was 'only the breeze' and she seems to die at ease.

=== Apollodorus, Hyginus, and Antoninus ===
The Bibliotheca gives an entirely different characterization of Procris. It states that Procris was bribed with a golden crown to sleep with Pteleon, but was discovered in his bed by her husband. She is described as fleeing to King Minos, who had been cursed by his wife Pasiphaë to ejaculate scorpions, serpents and centipedes that killed his mistresses from the inside. Procris was said to have helped cure the king of his genital sickness with a circean herb. She was given a dog no quarry could escape and an infallible javelin. The Bibliotheca states that she gave the dog and javelin to Cephalus and they were reconciled.

Hyginus (who states that the dog and javelin are gifts from the goddess Artemis) and Antoninus Liberalis, however, write that she disguised herself as a boy and seduced her husband, so that he too was guilty, and they were reconciled. According to the latter, Minos' unexplained disease not only killed his mistresses, but also prevented him and Pasiphaë from having any children (Pasiphaë herself was not otherwise harmed, being an immortal daughter of Helios). Procris then inserted a goat's bladder in a woman, told Minos to ejaculate there, and after that she sent him to his wife; the couple was thus able to conceive, and Minos gave his spear and his dog as gratitude gifts to her.

Unlike the other versions, Hyginus omits Cephalus' abduction by Eos; instead he rejects her when she propositions him, and she replies that she does not want him to break his marital vows unless Procris has. She then disguises him as a stranger who successfully seduces Procris. When they lie together in bed, Eos removes the enchantment from him, and Procris, realizing she has been deceived by Eos, flees in shame. After their reunion, Procris follows Cephalus in secret out of fear of Eos.

=== The dog and the fox ===
The name of the dog is Laelaps. The story of the hunting of the Teumessian fox, which could never be caught, and that Zeus turned to stone along with Procris' dog when the dog hunted it, and the death of Procris were told in one of the lost early Greek epics of the Cycle, most probably the Epigoni.

=== Medieval tradition ===
Procris' story is included in De Mulieribus Claris, a collection of biographies of historical and mythological women by the Florentine author Giovanni Boccaccio, composed in 1361–62. It is notable as the first collection devoted exclusively to biographies of women in Western literature.

=== Virgil ===
In Book VI of the Roman poet Virgil's Aeneid, Procris is one of the inhabitants of the "Mourning Fields" (Lugentes Campi), a region of the underworld visited by Aeneas.
