= Palamaon =

In Greek mythology, Palamaon (Ancient Greek: Παλαμάων) was the Athenian father of Daedalus, the famous architect of Labyrinth. The latter was attributed to various parentage: (1) Eupalamus and Alcippe, (2) Metion and Iphinoe, (3) Phrasmede or (4) Merope, daughter of King Erechtheus.
