= 1300s BC (decade) =

The 1300s BC is a decade that lasted from 1309 BC to 1300 BC.

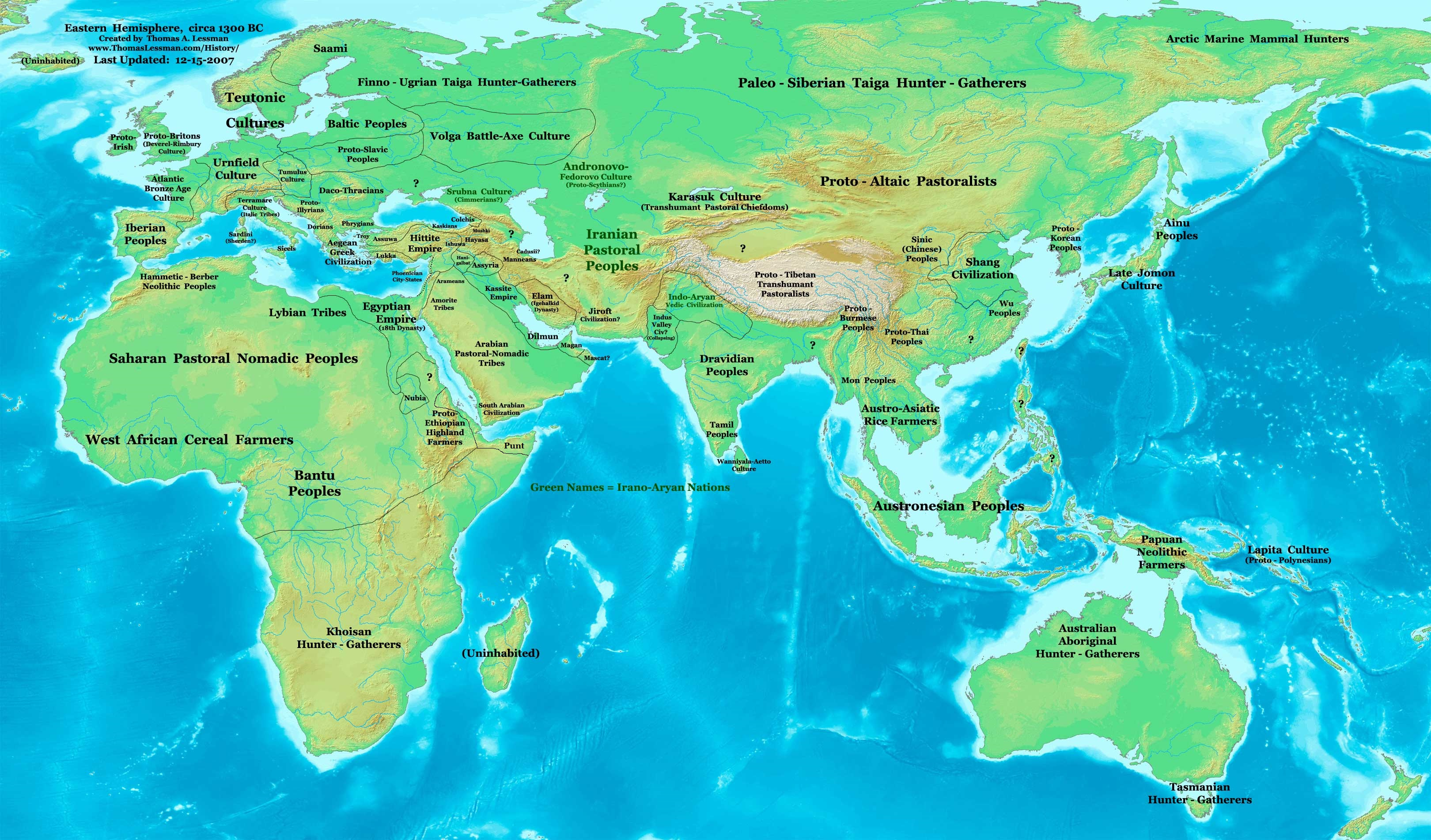
Map of the Eastern Hemisphere in 1300 BC

== Events and trends ==
- Cecrops II, legendary King of Athens, dies after a reign of 40 years and is succeeded by his son Pandion II. Pandion II was later driven into exile from Athens by the sons of Cecrops II's brother (or possibly nephew) Metion, so that Metion could take power. Pandion II fled to Megara, where he married the King's daughter and eventually inherited the throne. After his death, Pandion II's sons returned to Athens and drove out the sons of Metion.
- c. 1307 BC—Adad-nirari I becomes king of Assyria.
- 1306 BC (or 1319 BC)—Horemheb becomes pharaoh of Ancient Egypt.
- c. 1300 BC—Some people of the "Eastern Woodlands" begin to build massive earthworks, mounds of earth and stone. Poverty Point, Louisiana is the earliest one.
- c. 1300 BC – 1200 BC—The Treasury of Atreus is built in Mycenaean Greece.
- c. 1300 BC – 1200 BC—The palace at Pylos is built.
- c. 1300 BC – 1100 BC—The Warrior Vase is made in Mycenaean Greece.
- c. 1300 BC – 1250 BC—Around this time, birth of king Rama may have taken place in kingdom of Kosala.
- c. 1300 BC – 1250 BC–A battle at the Tollense valley, one of the oldest recorded in Europe, took place, resulting in many deaths.

== Significant people ==
- Pangeng of China
- Ramses II, Pharaoh of Egypt
