= Cecrops II =

Semi-legendary king of Athens

In Greek mythology, Cecrops II (/ˈsiːkrɒps/; Ancient Greek: Κέκροψ, Kékrops; gen.: Κέκροπος) was the legendary or semi-legendary seventh king of Athens and in whose reign the deeds of Dionysus and Perseus occurred.

== Family ==
Cecrops was the son of Pandion I, king of Athens and possibly the naiad Zeuxippe, and thus brother to Erechtheus, Butes, Procne, Philomela and Teuthras. In some accounts, his parents were identified to be King Erechtheus and the naiad Praxithea and thus he was brother to Pandorus, Metion, Protogeneia, Pandora, Procris, Creusa, Orithyia and Chthonia. His other possible siblings were Orneus, Thespius, Eupalamus, Sicyon and Merope.

Cecrops married Metiadusa, daughter of Eupalamus (his brother or a son of Metion), by whom he became the father of his heir, Pandion II.

== Mythology ==
After Poseidon having destroyed Erechtheus and his house during the war between Athens and Eleusis, Cecrops being the eldest of the dead king's children, succeeded to the throne. He was chosen by the appointed judge Xuthus, his brother-in-law, who was accordingly banished from the land by the rest of the sons of Erechtheus.

After ruling for 40 years, he was ousted by Metion and Pandorus, and fled to Aegilia or Aegialea where he would die.

Cecrops was succeeded in Athens by his son Pandion II (though Pandion II has also been said to be his nephew, the son of Erechtheus).

Regnal titles
Preceded by Erechtheus	King of Athens; 40	Succeeded by Pandion II
