= Diogenia =

In Greek mythology, Diogeneia or Diogenia (/daɪoʊˈdʒiːniə/; Ancient Greek: Διογένεια or Διογενία, lit. 'divine born' or 'descendant of the gods') was the Athenian naiad-daughter of the river-god Cephisus and wife of Phrasimus. The couple had a daughter named Praxithea who married Erechtheus of Athens.
