= Metiadusa =

In Greek mythology, Metiadusa (Ancient Greek: Μητιάδουσα, romanized: Mētiádousa, lit. 'one who is thoughtful or cautious in counsel') was a member of the Athenian royal family as the daughter of Prince Eupalamus and possibly Alcippe. She was probably the sister of Daedalus and Perdix. Metiadusa married King Cecrops II of Athens and became the mother of Pandion.
