= Theope =

Figures in Greek mythology

In Greek mythology, Theope (Ancient Greek: Θεόπη, romanized: Theópē, lit. 'god-voiced') may refer to the two distinct women:

- Theope, an Athenian daughter of Leos, and sister of Praxithea and Eubule. These women were said to have sacrificed themselves voluntarily, or to have been freely sacrificed by their father, for the safety of Athens in obedience to the Delphian oracle. A temenos called the Leocorium was dedicated to the worship of these three maidens at Athens.
- Theope, one of the Maenads who tried to kill King Lycurgus of Thrace.
