= Demarchos (name) =

Demarchos or Demarchus (Greek: δήμαρχος) has historically been a Greek civic office.

It can also refer to people of that name. These include:

- In Greek mythology, a son of Aegyptus, murdered by Eubule, one of the Danaïdes.
- An epic poet in an inscription in Ptolemais
- Demarchos, the son of Taron, a Lycian honoured by the Samians for his intercession on their behalf with Demetrios Poliorketes
- Demarchos, the son of Epidokos, a Syracusan general and opponent of the tyrant Dionysius I
- Satrap of Hellespontine Phrygia under Alexander the Great, successor of Calas
