= Eubule (mythology) =

Mythological Athenian woman

In Greek mythology, Eubule (Ancient Greek: Εὐβούλη, romanized: Eúboulē, lit. 'good councel') may refer to the following women:

- Eubule, one of the Danaides as daughter of Danaus. She married her paternal cousin Demarchus, son of Aegyptus, whom she eventually killed on their wedding night following the instructions of her father.
- Eubule, an Athenian daughter of Leos, and sister of Praxithea and Theope. Together with her sisters, they were said to have sacrificed themselves voluntarily, or to have been freely sacrificed by their father, for the safety of Athens in obedience to the Delphian oracle. A precinct called the Leocorium was dedicated to the worship of these three maidens at Athens.
