= Daedalus =

Greek mythological figure

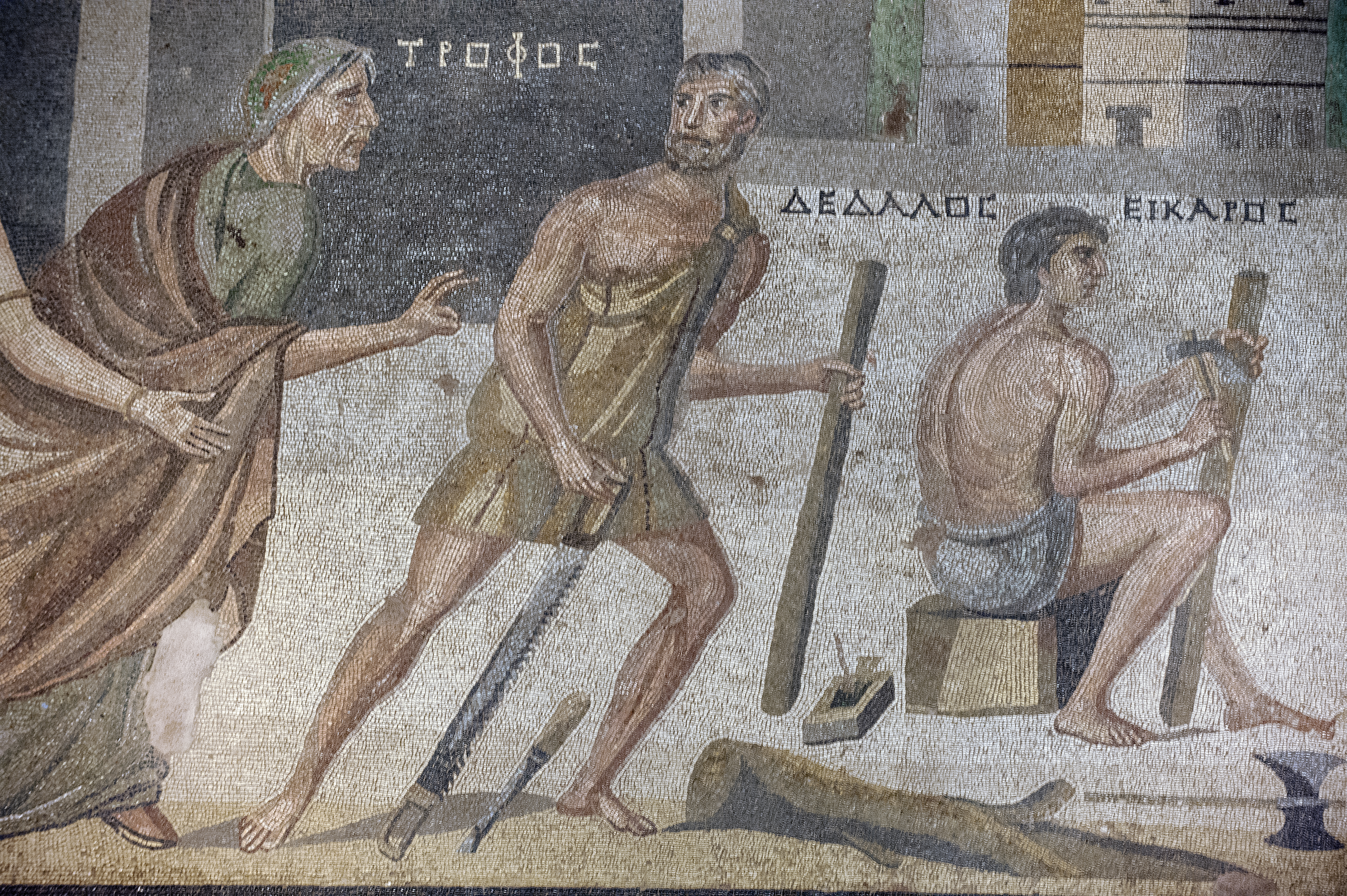
A Roman mosaic from Zeugma, Commagene (now in the Zeugma Mosaic Museum) depicting Daedalus and his son Icarus.

In Greek mythology, Daedalus (UK: /ˈdiːdələs/, US: /ˈdɛdələs/; Greek: Ancient Greek: Δαίδαλος, romanized: Daídalos, Etruscan: Taitale, lit. 'skillful craftsman', 'cunning worker' or 'finely worked') was a skillful architect and craftsman, seen as a symbol of wisdom, knowledge and power. He is the father of Icarus, the uncle of Perdix, and possibly also the father of Iapyx. Among his most famous creations are the wooden cow for Pasiphaë, the Labyrinth for King Minos of Crete which imprisoned the Minotaur, and wings that he and his son Icarus used to attempt to escape Crete. It was during this escape that Icarus did not listen to his father's warnings and flew too close to the Sun; the wax holding his wings together melted and Icarus fell to his death.

== Epigraphic evidence ==
The name Daidalos seems to be attested in Linear B, a writing system used to record Mycenaean Greek. The name appears in the form da-da-re-jo-de, possibly referring to a sanctuary.

== Family ==
Daedalus's parentage was supplied as a later addition, with various authors attributing different parents to him. His father is claimed to be either Eupalamus, Metion, or Palamaon. Similarly, his mother was either Alcippe, Iphinoe, Phrasmede or Merope, daughter of King Erechtheus. Daedalus had two sons: Icarus and Iapyx, along with a nephew named either Talos, Calos, or Perdix.

The Athenians rewrote the Cretan-born Daedalus as an Athenian himself, the grandson of the ancient king Erechtheus who only fled to Crete after killing his nephew.

== Inventor, architect, artist ==
A mythical craftsman named Daedalus is first mentioned in roughly 1400 BC on the Knossian Linear B tablets. He is later mentioned by Homer as the creator of a dancing floor for Ariadne, similar to that which Hephaestus placed on the Shield of Achilles. It is clear that this Daedalus was not an original character of Homer's. Rather, Homer was referencing mythology that his audience was already familiar with.

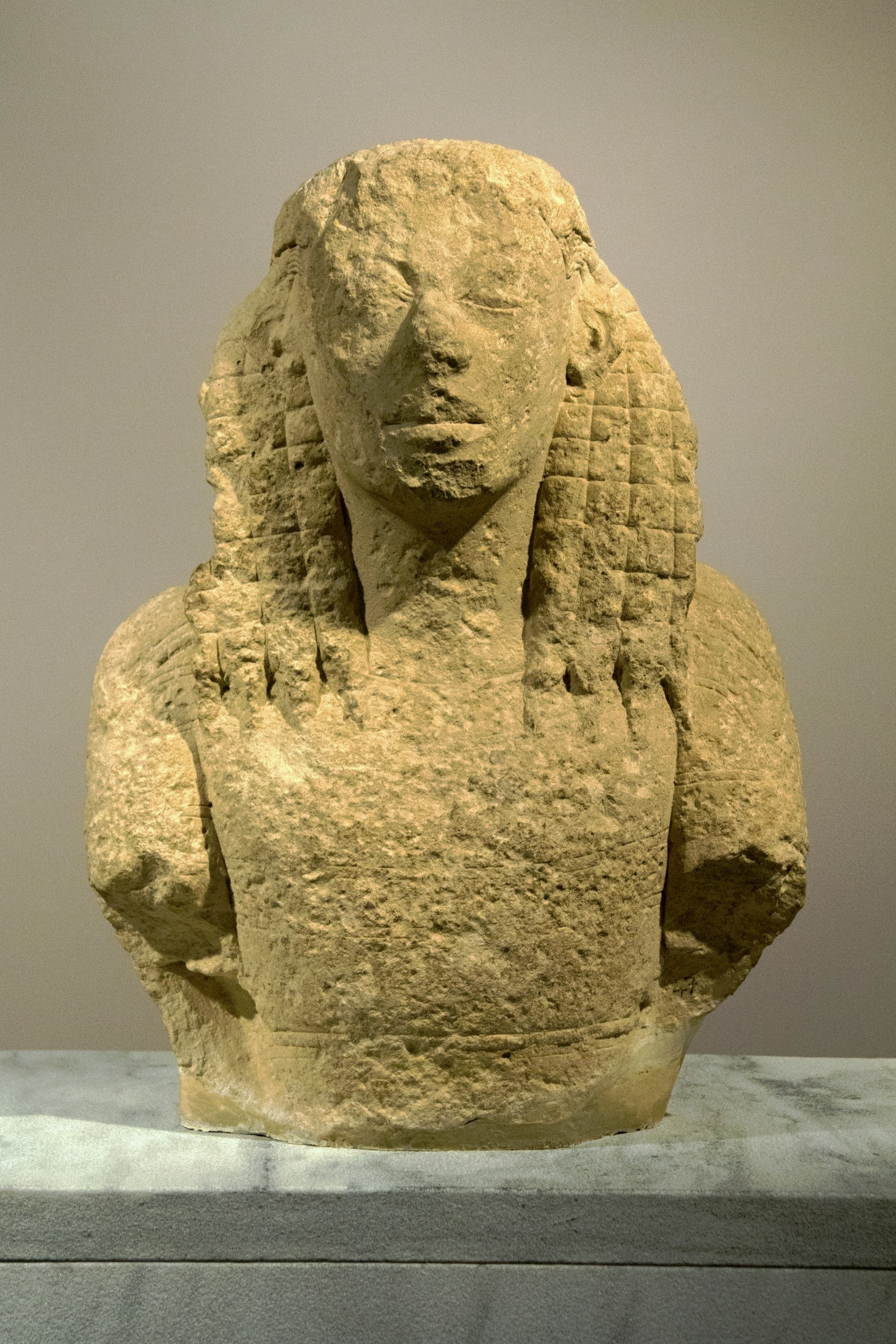
Upper body of a Daedalic statue of a Kore, poros stone. Eleutherna, archaic period, 7th century BC.

Daedalus is not mentioned again in literature until the fifth century BC, but he is widely praised as an inventor, artist, and architect, though classical sources disagree on which inventions exactly are attributable to him. In Pliny's Natural History (7.198) he is credited with inventing carpentry, including tools like the axe, saw, glue, and more. Supposedly, he first invented masts and sails for ships for the navy of King Minos. He is also said to have carved statues so spirited they appeared to be living and moving. Pausanias, in traveling around Greece, attributed to Daedalus numerous archaic wooden cult figures (see xoana) that impressed him. In fact, so many other statues and artworks are attributed to Daedalus by Pausanias and various other sources that likely many of them were never made by him.

In his Socratic dialogue with Meno, Plato cites Daedalus's handiwork as a metaphor for genuine understanding of truth, as opposed to belief that coincidentally happens to be true. Socrates argues that while truth, like one of Daedalus's "moving" statues, is inherently valuable, their animacy would mean they are worthless if the owner cannot shackle them in place to stop them from wandering off.

Daedalus gave his name, eponymously, to many Greek craftsmen and many Greek contraptions and inventions that represented dextrous skill. A specific sort of early Greek sculptures are named Daedalic sculpture in his honor. In Boeotia there was a festival, the Daedala, in which a temporary wooden altar was fashioned and an effigy was made from an oak-tree and dressed in bridal attire. It was carried in a cart with a woman who acted as bridesmaid. The image was called daedala. Some sources claim that the daedala did not receive their name from Daedalus, but the opposite. Pausanias claims that Daedalus was not the name given to the inventor at birth, but that he was named so later after the daedala.

Some of the functions of Daedalus overlapped with those of Aristaeus (Aristaeos), another famous Greek inventor god. But Aristaeos mostly concerned himself with the rural and agricultural arts.

== Mythology ==
=== Nephew ===
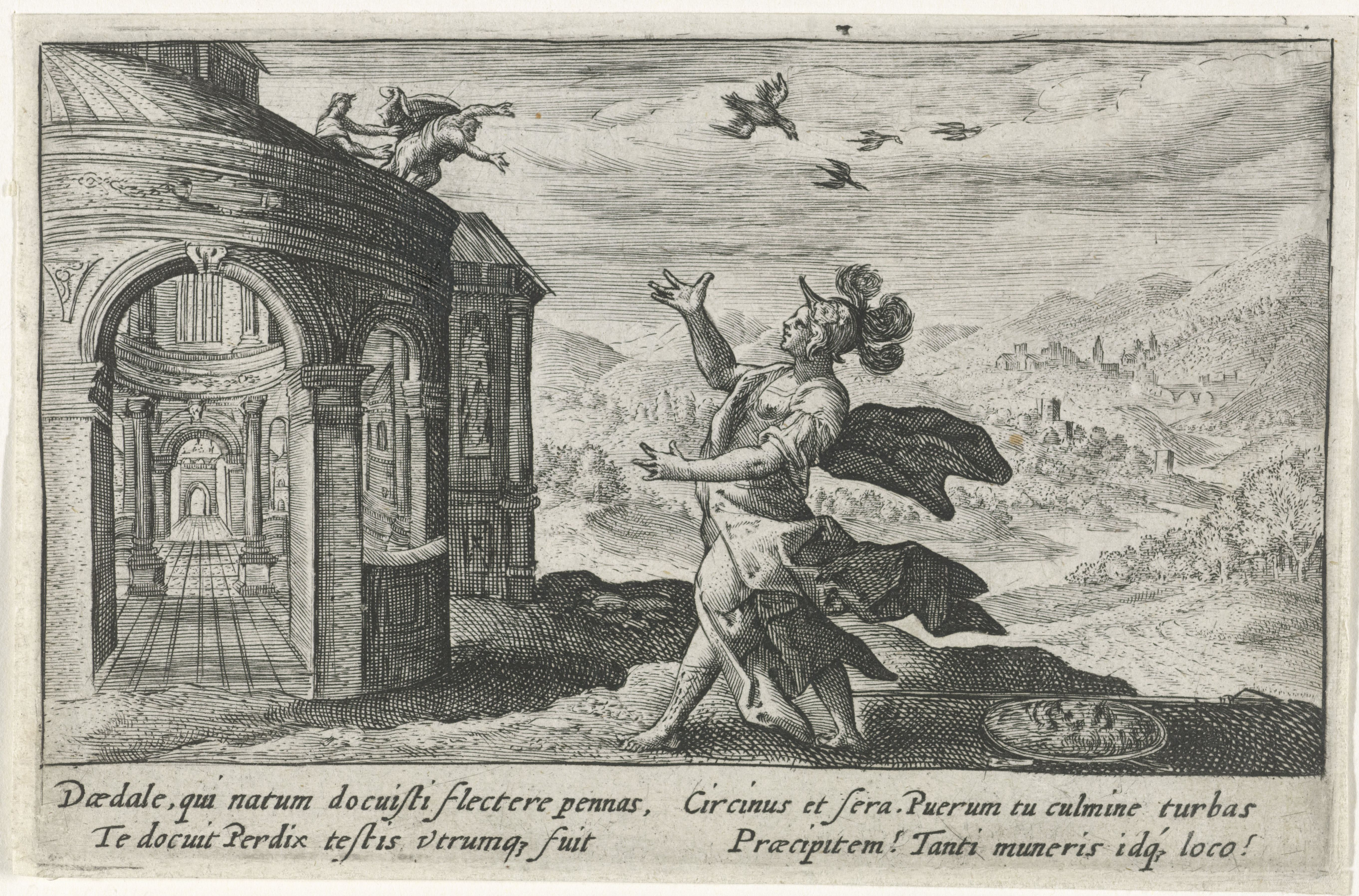
Perdix (Talus) changed into a partridge when thrown from the Acropolis by an envious Daedalus (1602–1607)

Daedalus was so proud of his achievements that he could not bear the idea of a rival. His sister had placed her son under his charge to be taught the mechanical arts as an apprentice. His nephew is named variously as Perdix, Talos, or Calos, although some sources say that Perdix was the name of Daedalus's sister. The nephew showed striking evidence of ingenuity. Finding the spine of a fish on the seashore, he took a piece of iron and notched it on the edge, and thus invented the saw. He put two pieces of iron together, connecting them at one end with a rivet, and sharpening the other ends, and made a pair of compasses. Daedalus was so envious of his nephew's accomplishments that he attempted to murder him by throwing him down from the Acropolis in Athens. Athena saved his nephew and turned him into a partridge. Tried and convicted for this murder attempt, Daedalus left Athens and fled to Crete.

=== The Labyrinth ===
Daedalus created the Labyrinth on Crete, in which the Minotaur was kept.

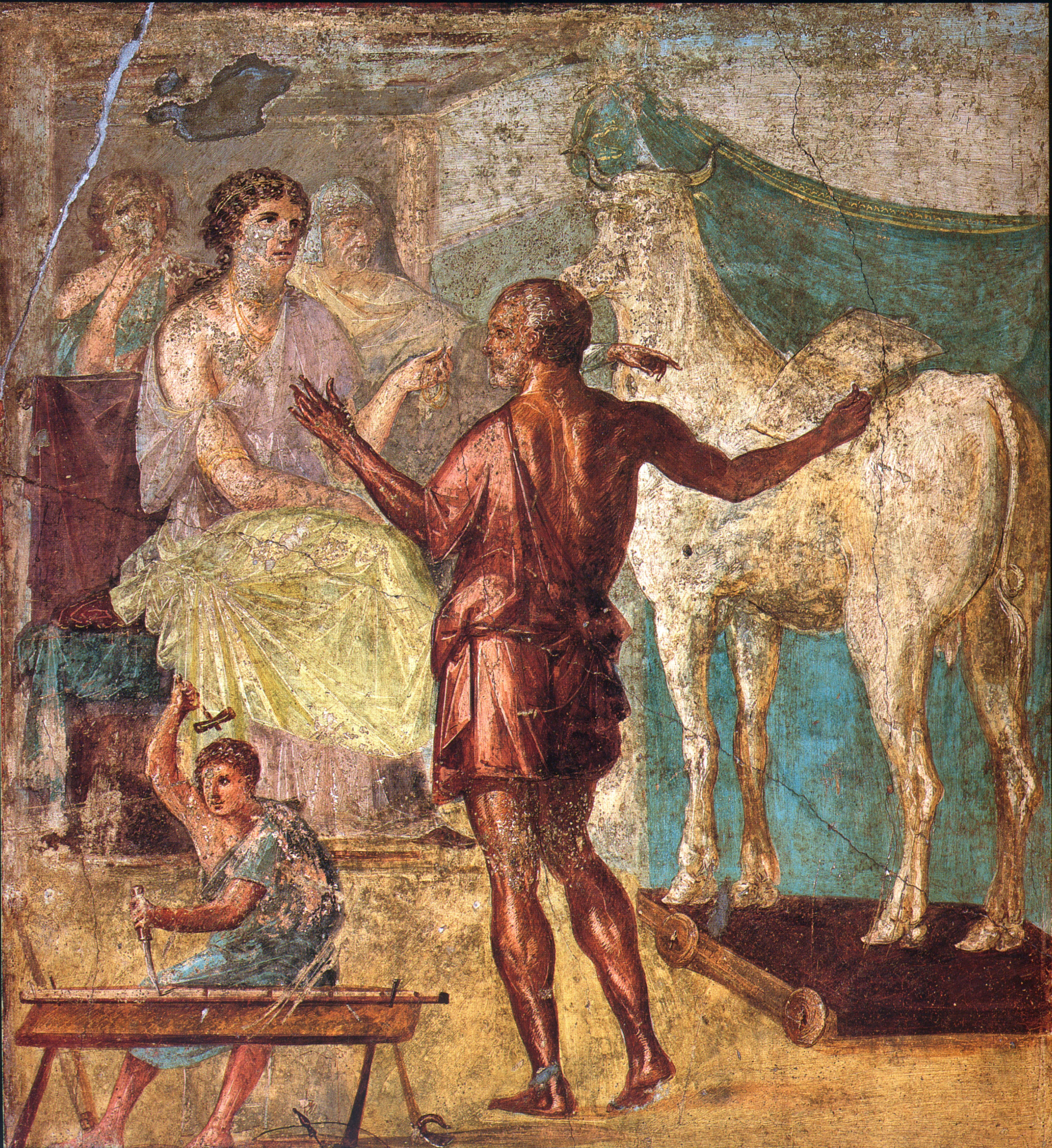
Daedalus and Pasiphaë. Roman fresco in the House of the Vettii, Pompeii, first century AD

Poseidon had given a white bull to King Minos to use it as a sacrifice. Instead, the king kept the bull for himself and sacrificed another. As revenge, Poseidon, with the help of Aphrodite, made King Minos's wife, Pasiphaë, lust for the bull. Pasiphaë asked Daedalus to help her. Daedalus built a hollow, wooden cow, covered in real cow hide for Pasiphaë, so she could mate with the bull. As a result, Pasiphaë gave birth to the Minotaur, a creature with the body of a man, but the head and tail of a bull. King Minos ordered the Minotaur to be imprisoned and guarded in the Labyrinth built by Daedalus for that purpose.

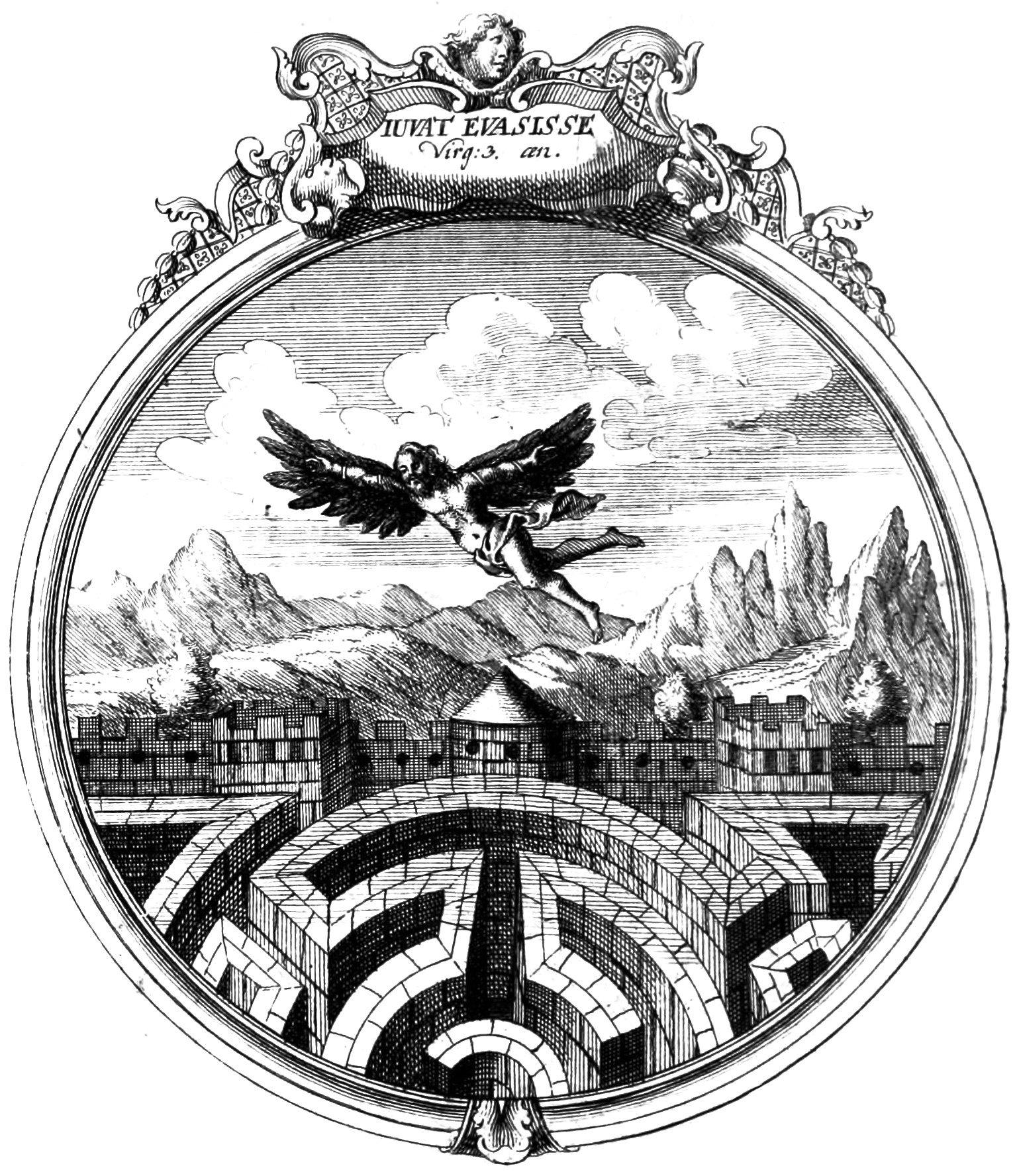
Daedalus escapes (iuvat evasisse) by Johann Christoph Sysang (1703–1757)

In the story of the Labyrinth as told by the Hellenes, the Athenian hero Theseus is challenged to kill the Minotaur, finding his way back out with the help of Ariadne's thread. It is Daedalus himself who gives Ariadne the clue as to how to escape the labyrinth.

Ignoring Homer, later writers envisaged the Labyrinth as an edifice rather than a single dancing path to the center and out again, and gave it numerous winding passages and turns that opened into one another, seeming to have neither beginning nor end. Ovid, in his Metamorphoses, suggests that Daedalus constructed the Labyrinth so cunningly that he himself could barely escape it after he built it.

=== Icarus ===
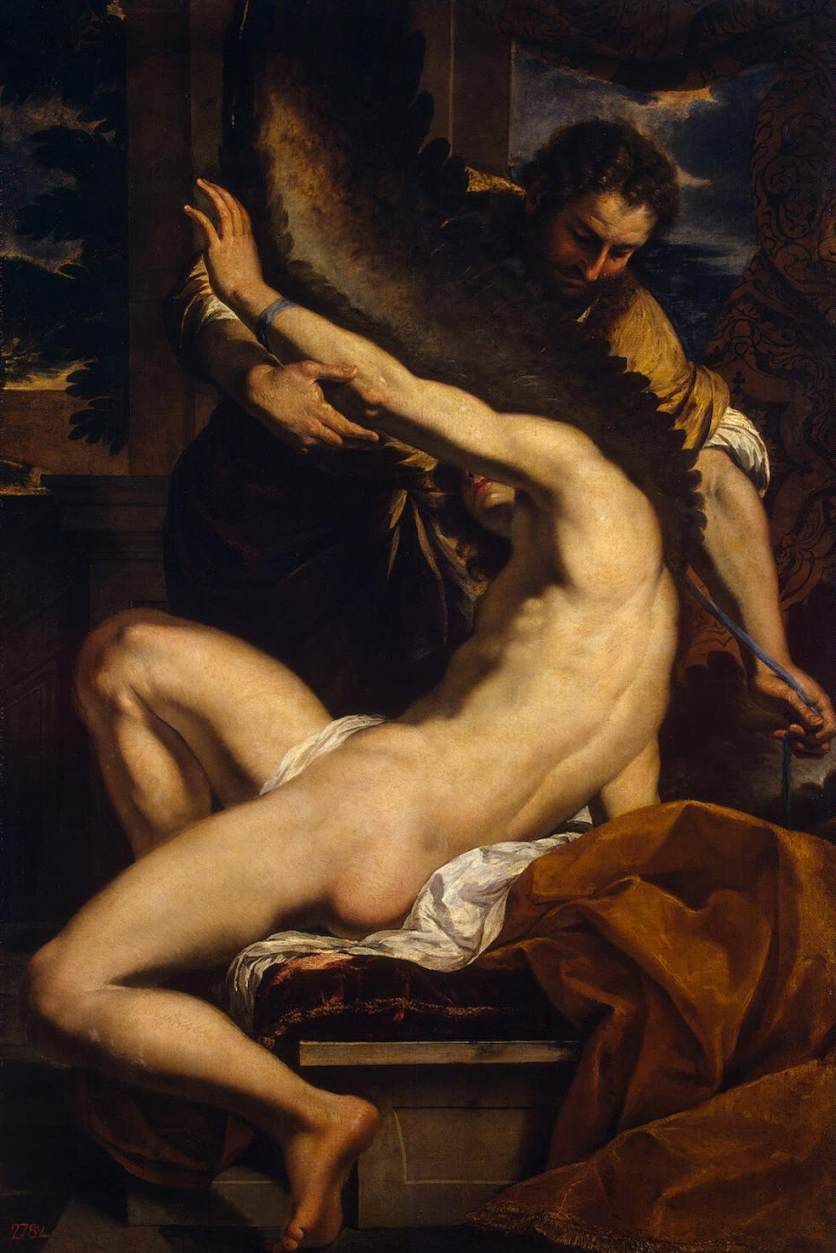
Daedalus and Icarus, c. 1645, by Charles Le Brun (1619–1690)

The most familiar literary telling explaining Daedalus's wings is a late one by Ovid in his Metamorphoses. After Theseus and Ariadne eloped together, Daedalus and his son Icarus were imprisoned by King Minos in the labyrinth that he had built. He could not leave Crete by sea, as King Minos kept a strict watch on all vessels, permitting none to sail without being carefully searched. Since Minos controlled the land routes as well, Daedalus set to work to make wings for himself and his son Icarus. Using bird feathers of various sizes, thread, and beeswax, he shaped them to resemble a bird's wings. When both were prepared for flight, Daedalus warned Icarus not to fly too high, because the heat of the Sun would melt the beeswax that held his feathers together, nor too low, because the sea foam would soak the feathers and make them heavy and he would fall. After Daedalus and Icarus had passed Samos, Delos, and Lebynthos, Icarus disobeyed his father and began to soar upward toward the Sun. The Sun melted the beeswax which held the feathers together. Icarus plunged into the sea and drowned. Seeing Icarus's wings floating, Daedalus wept, cursed his art, and after finding Icarus's body on an island shore buried him there. Then he named the island Icaria in the memory of his child. The southeast end of the Aegean Sea where Icarus fell into the water was also called "Mare Icarium" or the Icarian Sea. In a twist of fate, a partridge, presumably the nephew Daedalus murdered, mocked Daedalus as he buried his son. The fall and death of Icarus is seemingly portrayed as punishment for Daedalus's murder of his nephew.

Modern interpreters, including Edith Hamilton, note that Daedalus functions in Greek myth as more than an inventor figure. His story is often read as a reflection on the responsible use of human skill, contrasting his careful creativity with Icarus's impulsive disregard for limits. Hamilton positions Daedalus as an example of practical intelligence guided by restraint, suggesting that his inventions illustrate both the creative potential and the possible hazards of technical ability when misused. This interpretive view highlights Daedalus as a symbol of disciplined craftsmanship within Greek cultural tradition.

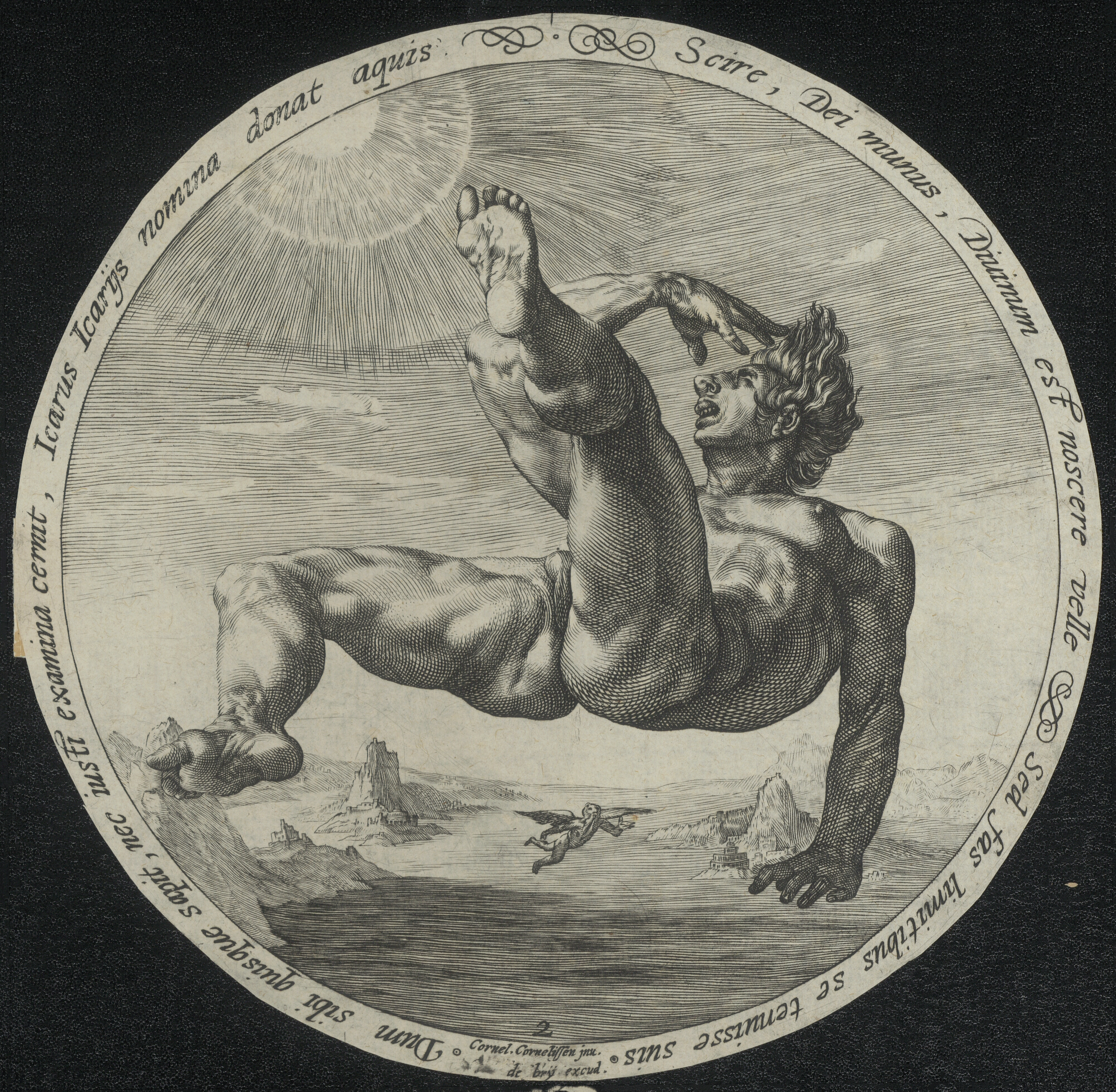
Print of Icarus falling after his wings were broken.

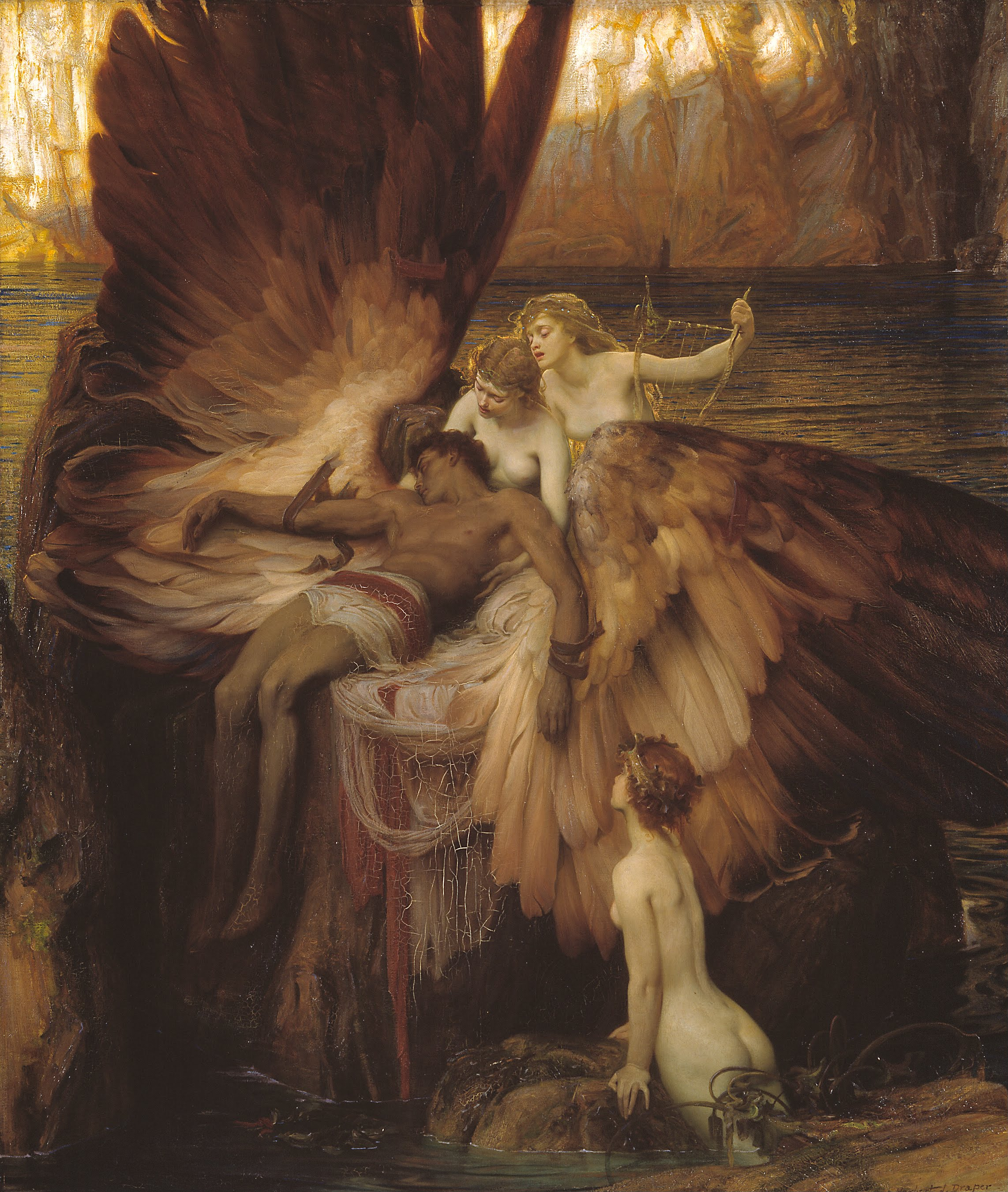
The Lament for Icarus by H. J. Draper (1898)

=== The shell riddle ===
Daedalus wept and called the island Icaria in the memory of his child. Afterwards, he traveled to Camicus in Sicily, where he stayed as a guest under the protection of King Cocalus. Ancient traditions associated Daedalus with building works in Sicily, including the Wall of Daedalus at Eryx near the sanctuary of Aphrodite later known as the Temple of Venus Erycina. Diodorus Siculus described the wall as built upon a steep precipice and difficult to attack. At Camicus, Daedalus was said to have built a temple to Apollo. Then he hung up his wings as an offering to the god and promised to never fly again. In an invention of Virgil (Aeneid VI), Daedalus flies to Cumae and founds his temple there, rather than in Sicily.

Minos, meanwhile, searched for Daedalus by traveling from city to city asking a riddle. He presented a spiral seashell and asked for a string to be run through it. When he reached Camicus, King Cocalus, knowing Daedalus would be able to solve the riddle, accepted the shell and gave it to Daedalus. Daedalus tied the string to an ant which, lured by a drop of honey at one end, walked through the seashell stringing it all the way through. With the riddle solved, Minos realized that Daedalus was in the court of King Cocalus and insisted he be handed over. Cocalus agreed to do so, but convinced Minos to take a bath first. In the bath, Cocalus's daughters killed Minos, possibly by pouring boiling water over his body. In some versions, it is Cocalus that kills Minos in the bath. Other variants say that Daedalus himself poured the boiling water, or that he had built the pipes that could supply hot water to the bath and this was used to instead pour boiling water on him.

=== Death ===
At least two locations are associated with the death of Daedalus. One version of the story says he retired to the Cretan colony of Telmessos, ruled by Minos's estranged brother Sarpedon, and while wandering outside the city, he was bitten by a snake and died. A town on this site, Daidala, is said to be named after him, and is mentioned in Roman sources. Another version of the story places his death on a small island in the Nile river, where he was later worshipped. Yet another version has him dying after being bitten by a water snake in Lycia (western Asia Minor).

The anecdotes are literary and late. However, in the founding tales of the Greek colony of Gela, founded in the 680s BC on the southwest coast of Sicily, a tradition was preserved that the Greeks had seized cult images wrought by Daedalus from their local predecessors, the Sicani.

== Later depictions in art and literature ==
Daedalus and the myths associated with him are often depicted in paintings, sculptures, and more by later artists. The myth about his flight and the fall of Icarus is especially popular in depictions. A few noteworthy pieces are included below.

Depictions in classical art

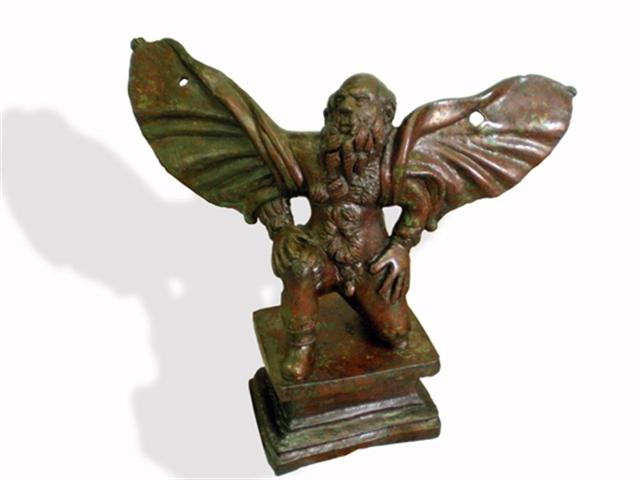
Small bronze sculpture of Daedalus, 3rd century BC; found on Plaoshnik, North Macedonia

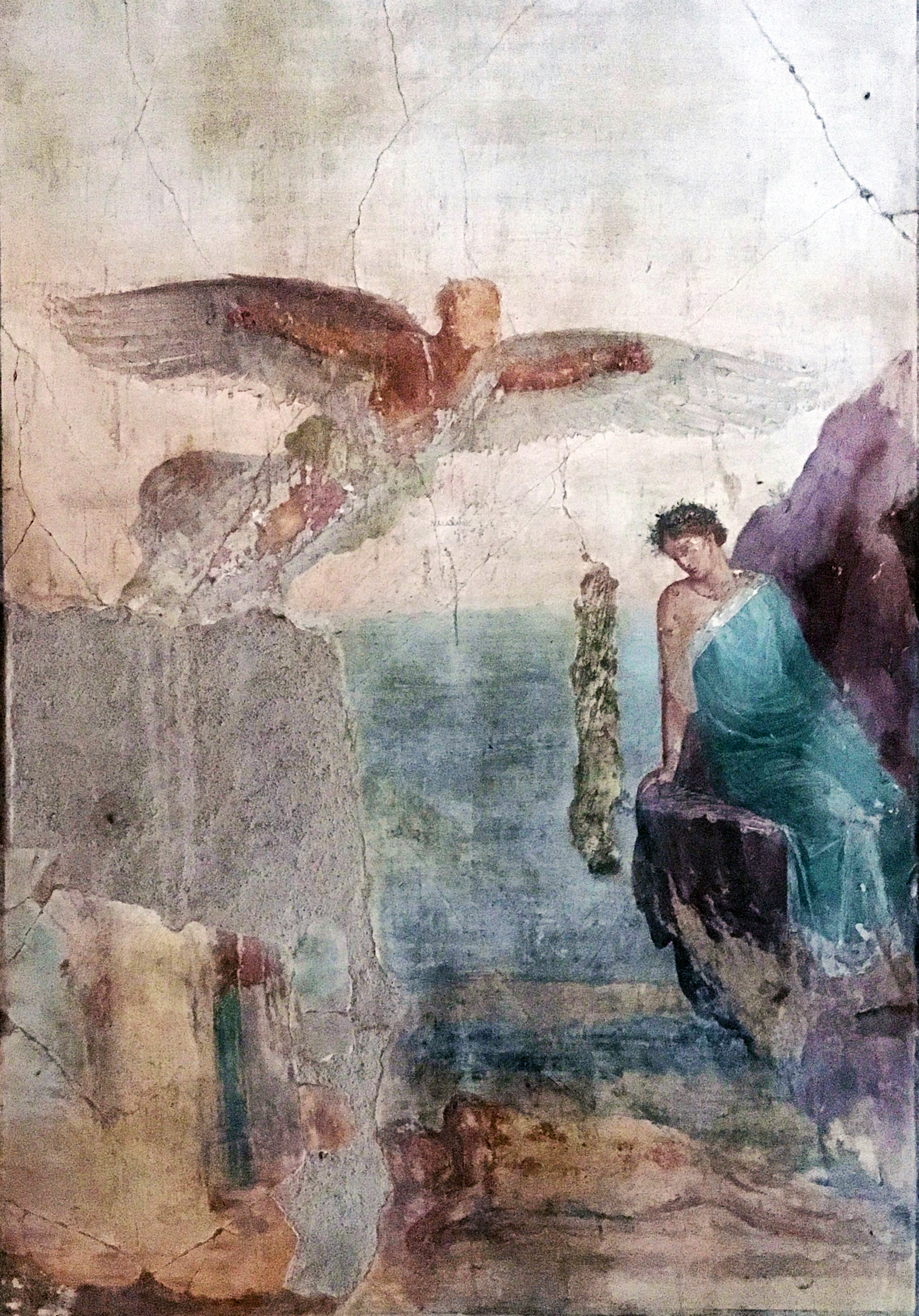
Daedalus and Icarus, fresco in Pompeii, 1st century AD

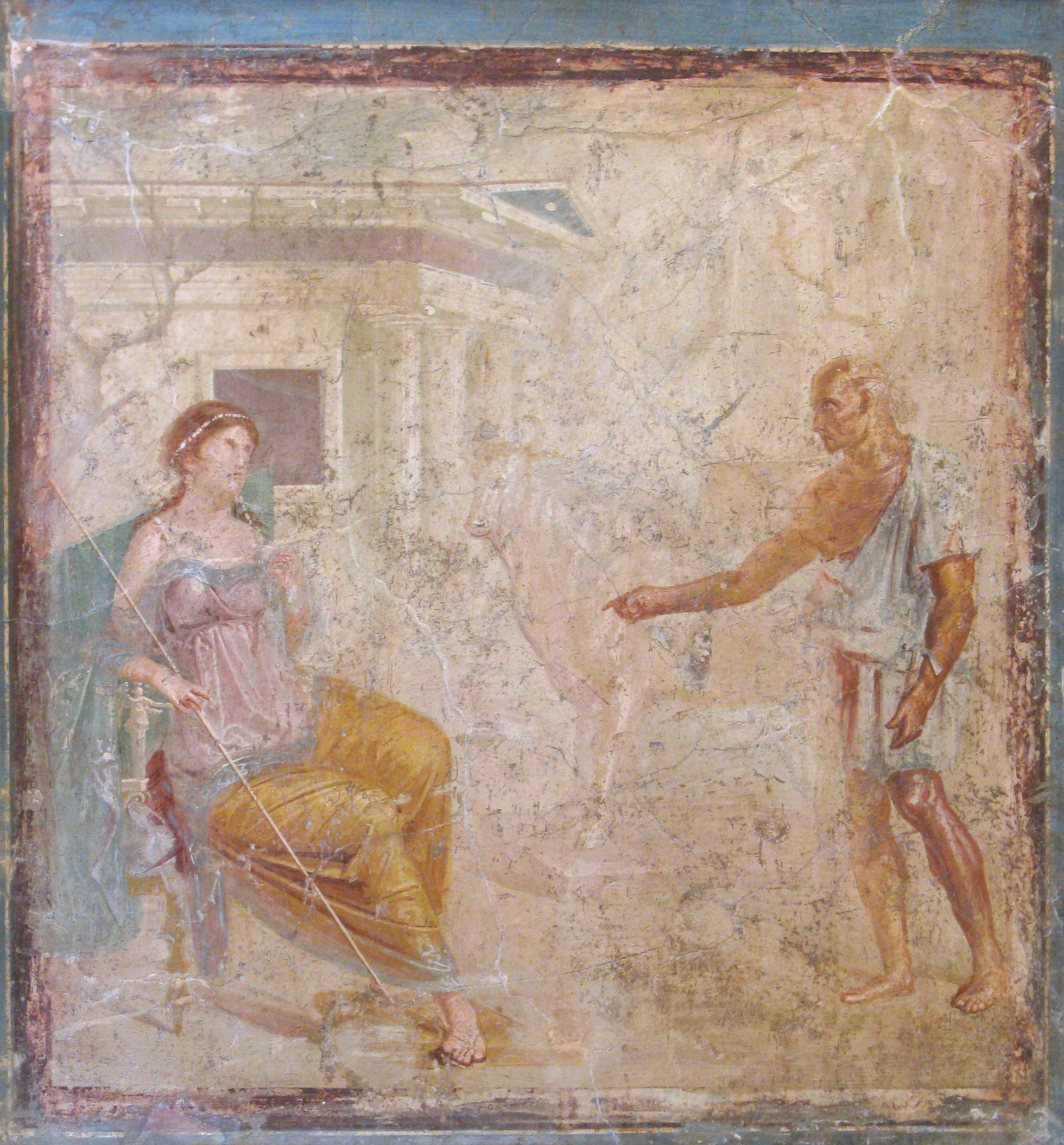
Daedalus and Pasiphaë, fresco in Pompeii, 1st century AD

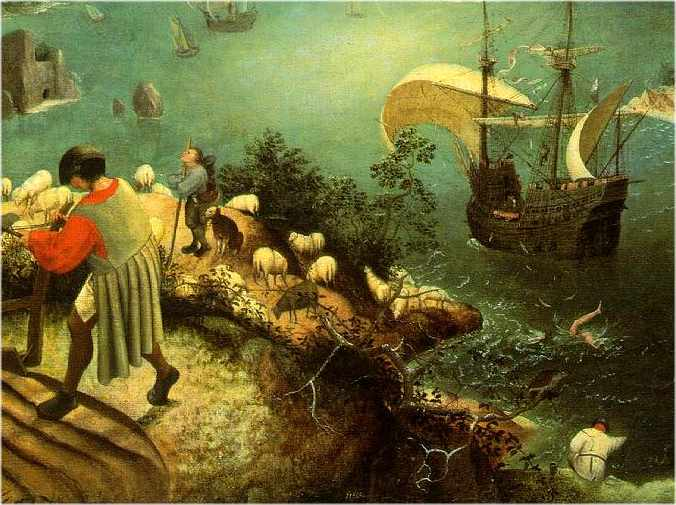
Landscape with the Fall of Icarus (detail) by Peter Brueghel the Elder, ca. 1558.

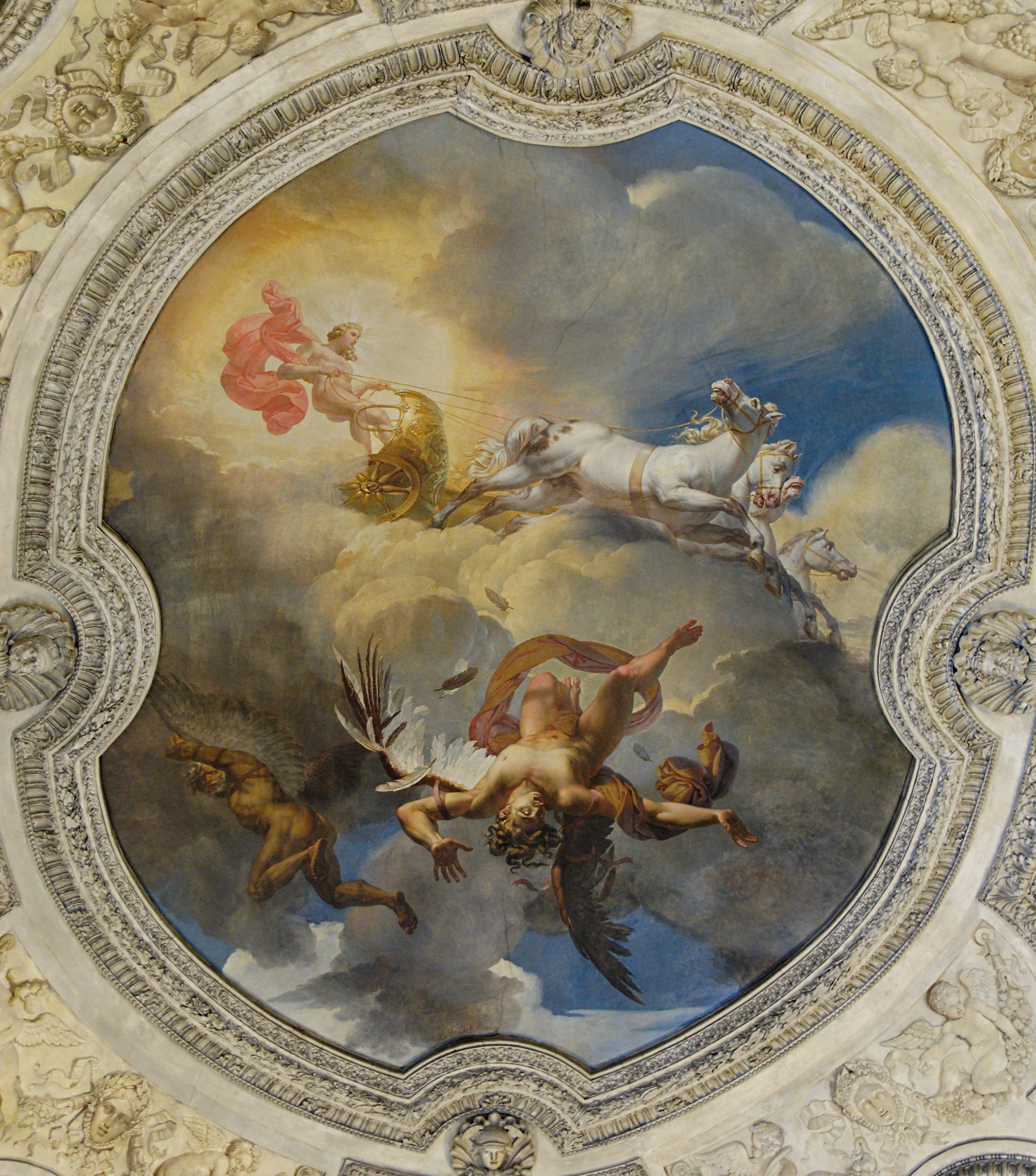
The Fall of Icarus by Merry-Josoph Blondel (1819) (Louvre)

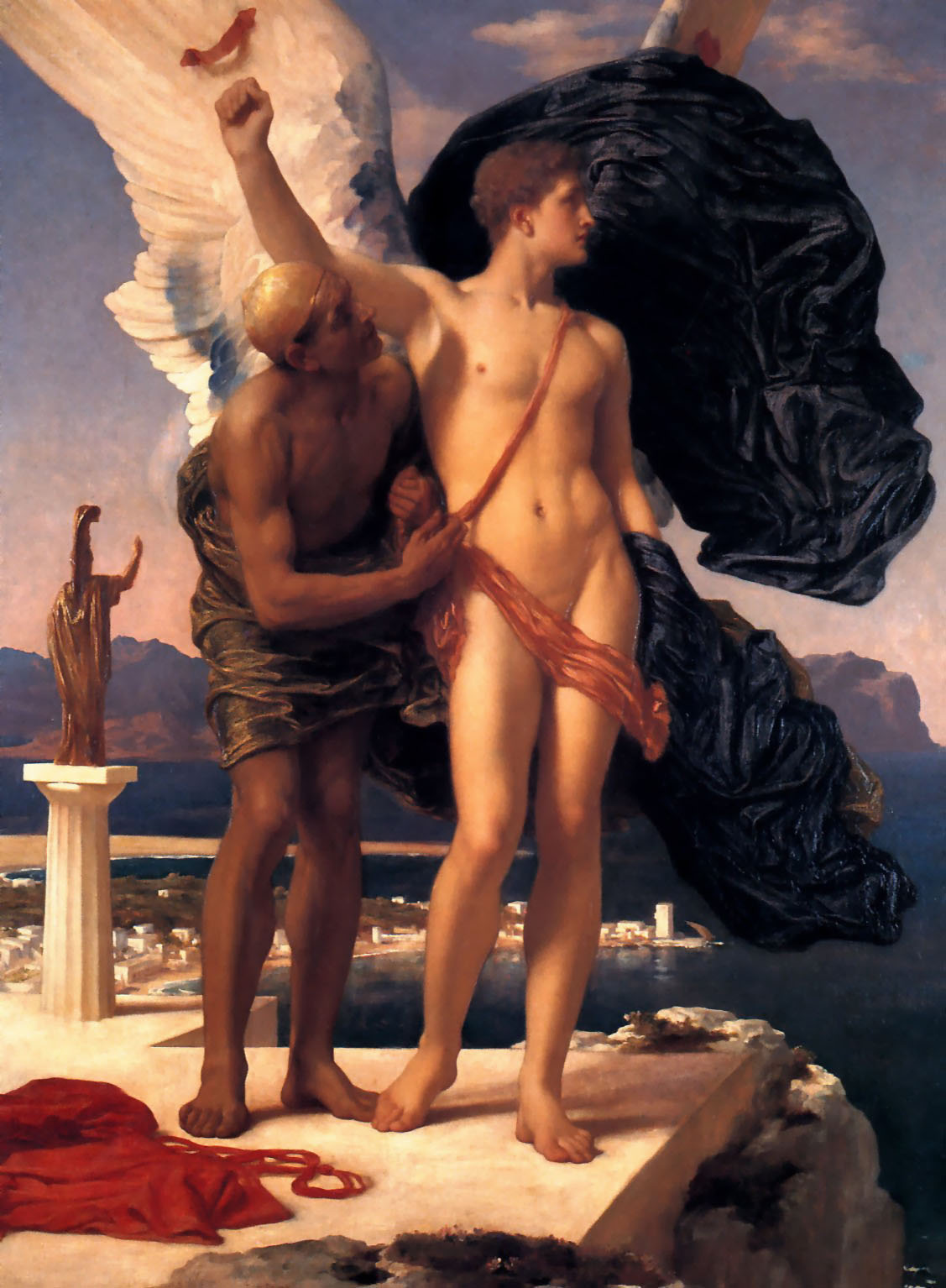
Daedalus and Icarus, by Frederick Leighton, c. 1869

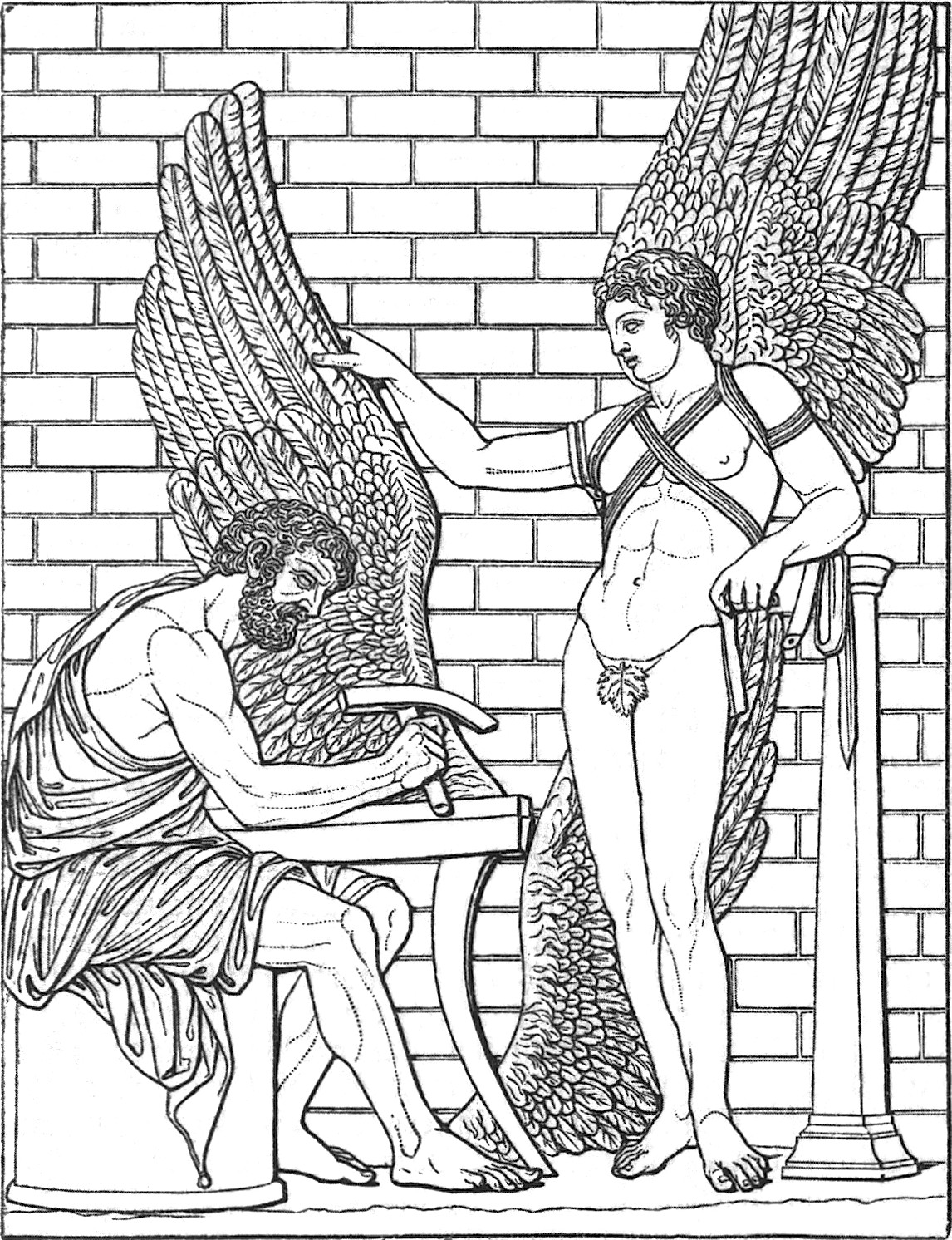
Daedalus constructs wings for his son, Icarus, after a Roman relief in the Villa Albani, Rome (Meyers Konversationslexikon, 1890)

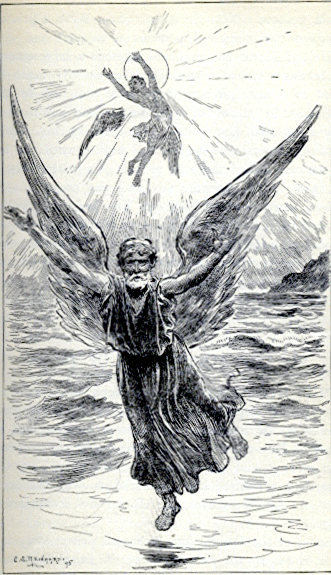
Dædalus and Icarus by H.A.Guerber (1896)

There are also a number of adaptations of the myth of Daedalus and Icarus in modern literature and film, including a poem by Edward Field.
