= Praxithea =

Five figures in Greek mythology

In Greek mythology, Praxithea (/ˌpræɡˈzɪθiə/; Ancient Greek: Ancient Greek: Πραξιθέα, lit. 'exacting goddess' or 'commerce goddess') was a name attributed to five women.

- Praxithea, a Naiad nymph. She married Erichthonius of Athens and by him had a son named Pandion I. Praxithea's sister Zeuxippe married her nephew Pandion, and to them were born Erechtheus, Butes, Procne and Philomela. She was also called Pasithea.
- Praxithea, an Athenian daughter of Phrasimus and Diogeneia, daughter of the river-god Cephissus. She became queen of Athens after marrying King Erechtheus by whom she bore Cecrops, Pandorus, Metion, Protogeneia, Pandora, Procris, Creusa, Oreithyia and Chthonia. Praxithea's other possible children were Orneus, Thespius, Eupalamus, Sicyon and Merope.
- Praxithea, the woman that cried out when she saw Demeter holding Metanira's son Demophon in the fires, thus preventing him from becoming immortal.
- Praxithea (or Phrasithea), daughter of Leos. Along with her sisters, Theope and Eubule, she sacrificed herself in order to save Athens. In another version, their father was the one who offered them up to sacrifice. A precinct called the Leocorium was dedicated to the worship of these three maidens at Athens.
- Praxithea, a Thespian princess as one of the 50 daughters of King Thespius and Megamede or by one of his many wives. When Heracles hunted and ultimately slew the Cithaeronian lion, Praxithea and her other sisters, except for one, all lay with the hero in a night, a week or for 50 days as their father strongly desired. Praxithea bore Heracles a son, Nephus.
