= The Rape of Orithyia by Boreas =

1620 painting by Peter Paul Rubens

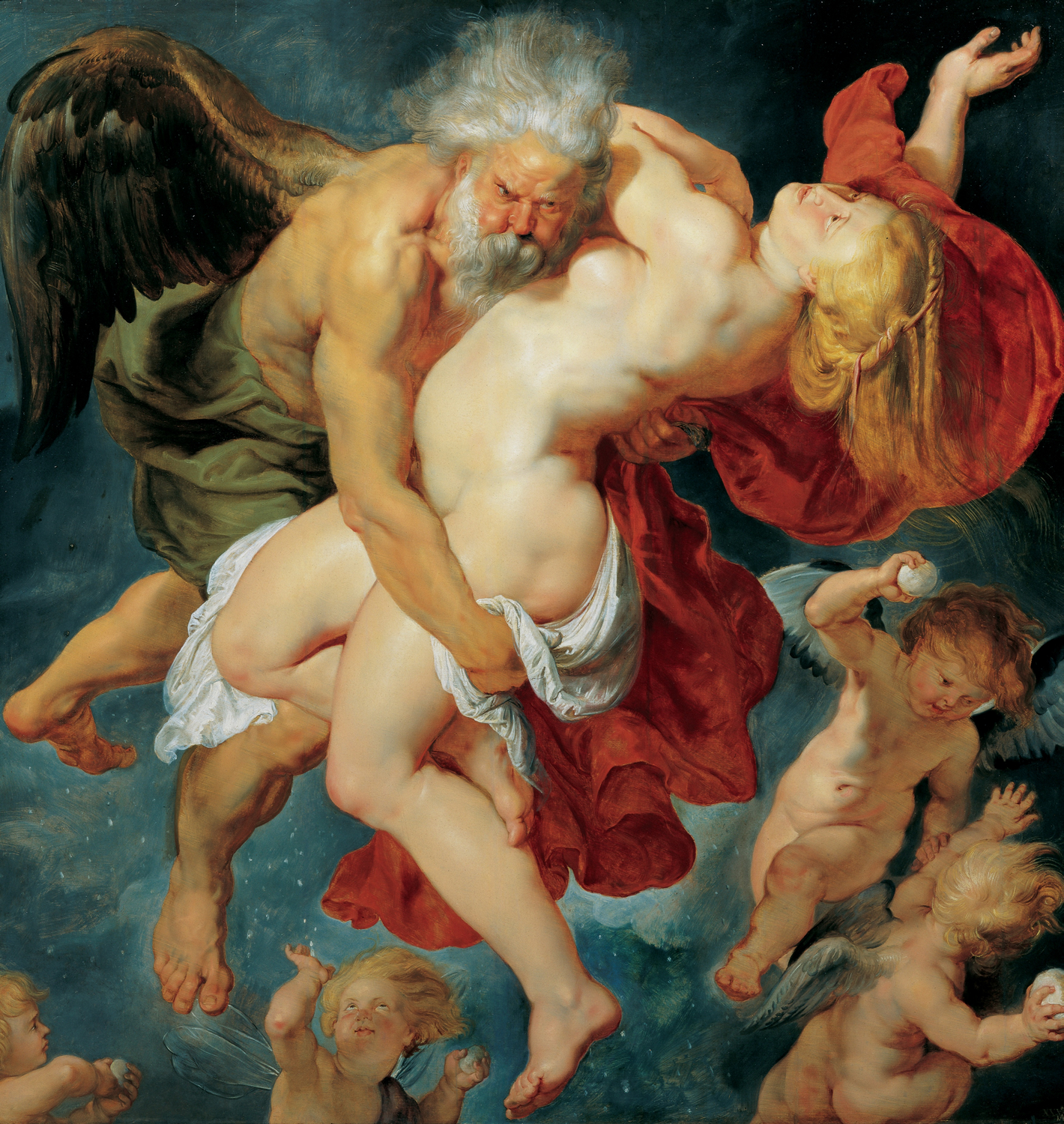
The Rape of Orithyia by Boreas (1620) by Rubens

The Rape of Orithyia by Boreas is a 1620 painting by Peter Paul Rubens, now in the Academy of Fine Arts Vienna. It shows the rape of Orithyia by Boreas.
