= Metion =

In Greek mythology, son of King Erechtheus of Athens

In Greek mythology, Metion (/ˈmiːʃən/; Ancient Greek: Μητίων, gen. Μητίονος, romanized: Mētīōn, lit. 'the planner', 'he of counsel' or 'mastermind') was an Athenian prince as the son of King Erechtheus and Praxithea, daughter of Phrasimus and Diogeneia.

== Family ==
Metion was the brother of Cecrops, Pandorus, Protogeneia, Pandora, Creusa, Procris, Oreithyia and Chthonia. His other possible siblings were Merope, Orneus, Thespius, Eupalamus and Sicyon.

In some accounts, Metion's father was Eupalamus, son of Erechtheus, instead. He had sons known collectively as the Metionidae (Μητιονίδαι) which probably include Eupalamus, Sicyon, and Daedalus (his son by Iphinoe). These mentioned sons are sometimes credited with other parentages.

== Mythology ==
The Metionids later drove King Pandion II out of Athens into exile. These usurping sons were in turn overthrown by the sons of Pandion: Aegeus, Nisus, Lycus and Pallas.
