= Aigilia =

Aigilia (Ancient Greek: Αἰγιλία) may refer to:

- Aegilia (Attica), a deme of ancient Attica
- Aigilia, ancient name of Antikythera, an island in the Aegean Sea
- Aigilia, ancient name of Stouronisi, an island off Euboea

== See also ==
- Aegilia
