= Leos (mythology) =

Two figures in Greek mythology

In Greek mythology, Leos (/ˈliːˌɒs/; Ancient Greek: Λεώς) may refer to the following personages:

- Leos, one of the ten or twelve Eponyms of the Attic phylae whose statues were at the Athenian agora near the Tholos. He was the son of Orpheus and father of a son, Cylanthus, and of three daughters, Praxithea (or Phasithea, Phrasithea), Theope and Eubule. In obedience to the Delphian oracle he had his three daughters sacrificed in order to relieve the city of famine. A location in Attica and a hero-shrine was said to have received the name Leokorion/Leocorion after these daughters of Leos (Λεὡ κόραι, Leō korai) and Leokorion (Λεωκόριον). In reality though, the story of the daughters of Leos could have been invented to explain the placename.
- Leos, a native of Agnus, Attica, the herald of the sons of Pallas. He betrayed them by informing Theseus of their imminent attack, which let him strike at them while they were unaware and win. From that circumstance there was no intermarriage between the demes Agnus and Pallene, and the Pallenian heralds never used the formula "ἀκούετε λεῷ" ("Listen, people") because of the homophony of the word leōs "people" and Leos' name. The people of Agnus, on the contrary, sacrificed to Leos.

== See also ==
- Hyacinthus of Lacedaemon
