= Erechtheus =

Archaic king of Athens

Marble relief with Erechtheus sitting on a rock from the Acropolis of Athens, 375 BC, Acropolis Museum.

Erechtheus (/ɪˈrɛkθjuːs, -θiəs/; Ancient Greek: Ἐρεχθεύς, romanized: Erekhtheús, lit. 'smasher of earth') in Greek mythology was a king of Athens, the founder of the polis and, in his role as god, attached to Poseidon, as "Poseidon Erechtheus". The name Erichthonius is carried by a son of Erechtheus, but Plutarch conflated the two names in the myth of the begetting of Erechtheus.

== Erechtheus I ==
Athenians thought of themselves as Erechtheidai, the "sons of Erechtheus". In Homer's Iliad (2. 547–48) Erechtheus is the son of "grain-giving Earth", reared by Athena. The earth-born son was sired by Hephaestus, whose semen Athena wiped from her thigh with a fillet of wool cast to earth, by which Gaia was made pregnant.

In the contest for patronage of Athens between Poseidon and Athena, the salt spring on the Acropolis where Poseidon's trident struck was known as the sea of Erechtheus.

== Erechtheus II, king of Athens ==
=== Family ===
The second Erechtheus was given a historicizing genealogy as son and heir to King Pandion I of Athens by Zeuxippe, this Pandion being son of Erichthonius. This later king Erechtheus may be distinguished as Erechtheus II. His siblings were Philomela, Procne, Butes and possibly Teuthras.

Erechtheus was father, by his wife Praxithea, of sons: Cecrops, Pandorus, Metion and of six daughters, the eldest was Protogeneia, Pandora, Procris, Creusa, Oreithyia and Chthonia. Sometimes, his other mentioned children were Orneus, Thespius, Eupalamus, Sicyon and Merope.

| Relation | Names | Sources | | | | | | | |
|---|---|---|---|---|---|---|---|---|---|
| Relation | Names | Hesiod | Diodorus | Apollodorus | Plutarch | Hyginus | Pausanias | Stephanus | Suida |
| Parents | Pandion and Zeuxippe | | | ✓ | | | | | |
| Parents | Pandion | | | | | | ✓ | | |
| Siblings | Procne | | | ✓ | | | | | |
| Siblings | Philomela | | | ✓ | | | | | |
| Siblings | Butes | | | ✓ | | | | | |
| Siblings | Cephalus | | | | | ✓ | | | |
| Siblings | Teuthras | | | | | | | ✓ | |
| Wife | Praxithea | | | ✓ | | | | | |
| Children | Cecrops | | | ✓ | | | ✓ | | |
| Children | Eupalamus | | ✓ | | | | | | |
| Children | Pandorus | | | ✓ | | | | | |
| Children | Metion | | | ✓ | | | ✓ | | |
| Children | Orneus | | | | | | ✓ | ✓ | |
| Children | Sicyon | ✓ | | | | | ✓ | | |
| Children | Thespius | | ✓ | | | | | | |
| Children | Protogeneia | | | | | | | | ✓ |
| Children | Pandora | | | | | | | | ✓ |
| Children | Procris | | | ✓ | | | ✓ | | ✓ |
| Children | Creusa | | | ✓ | | | ✓ | ✓ | ✓ |
| Children | Orithyia | | ✓ | ✓ | | | | | ✓ |
| Children | Chthonia | | | ✓ | | | | | ✓ |
| Children | Merope | | | | ✓ | | | | |

According to Pseudo-Apollodorus, Erechtheus II had a twin brother named Butes who married Erechtheus' daughter Chthonia, the "earth-born". The brothers divided the royal power possessed by Pandion, Erechtheus taking the physical rule but Butes taking the priesthood of Athena and Poseidon, this right being passed on to his descendants. This late origin myth or aition justified and validated the descent of the hereditary priesthood of the Boutidai family.

=== Reign ===
His reign was marked by the war between Athens and Eleusis, when the Eleusinians were commanded by Eumolpus, coming from Thrace. An oracle declared that Athens' survival depended on the death of one of the three daughters of Erechtheus. Perhaps this means the three unmarried daughters. In one version it is Chthonia, the youngest, whom he sacrifices. In another, it is both Protogeneia and Pandora, the two eldest, who offer themselves up. In any case the remaining sisters (excepting Orithyia who had been kidnapped by Boreas), or at least some of them, are said to kill themselves. The story of the unfortunate daughters of Erechtheus is comparable to those of the daughters of Hyacinthus of Lacedaemon, and of the daughters of Leos.

In the following battle between the forces of Athens and Eleusis, Erechtheus won the battle and slew Eumolpus, but then himself fell, struck down by Poseidon's trident. According to fragments of Euripides' tragedy Erechtheus, Poseidon avenged his son Eumolpus' death by driving Erechtheus into the earth with blows of his trident,

The ending lines of Euripides' tragedy were recovered in 1965 from a papyrus fragment. They demonstrate for Burkert that "the founding of the Erechtheum and the institution of the priestess of Athena coincide." Athena resolves the action by instructing Erichtheus' widow Praxithea:

...and for your husband I command a shrine to be constructed in the middle of the city; he will be known for him who killed him, under the name of 'sacred Poseidon'; but among the citizens, when the sacrificial cattle are slaughtered, he shall also be called 'Erechtheus'. To you, however, since you have rebuilt the city's foundations, I grant the duty of bringing in the preliminary fire-sacrifices for the city, and to be called my priestess.

In the Athenian king-list, Xuthus, the son-in-law of Erechtheus, was asked to choose his successor from among his many sons and chose Cecrops II, named for the mythic founder-king Cecrops. Thus Erechtheus is succeeded by Cecrops II, his brother, according to a fragment from the poet Casto. But according to pseudo-Apollodorus he was succeeded by his son.

Regnal titles
| Preceded by Pandion I | King of Athens; 50 years | Succeeded by Cecrops II |

== Erechtheion ==
The central gods of the Acropolis of Athens were Poseidon Erechtheus and Athena Polias, "Athena patron-guardian of the city". The Odyssey (VII.81) already records that Athena returned to Athens and "entered the strong-built house of Erechtheus". The archaic joint temple built upon the spot that was identified as the Kekropion, the hero-grave of the mythic founder-king Cecrops and the serpent that embodied his spirit was destroyed by the Persian forces in 480 BC, during the Greco-Persian wars, and was replaced between 421 and 407 BC by the present Erechtheum. Continuity of the site made sacred by the presence of Cecrops is inherent in the reference in Nonnus' Dionysiaca to the Erechtheion lamp as "the lamp of Cecrops". Priests of the Erechtheum and the priestess of Athena jointly took part in the procession to Skiron that inaugurated the Skira festival near the end of the Athenian year. Their object was the temenos at Skiron of the hero-seer Skiros, who had aided Eumolpus in the war between Athens and Eleusis in which Erechtheus II, the hero-king, was both triumphant and died.

That Poseidon and Erechtheus were two names at Athens for the same figure (see below) was demonstrated in the cult at the Erechtheum, where there was a single altar, a single priest and sacrifices were dedicated to Poseidon Erechtheus, Walter Burkert observed, adding "An historian would say that a Homeric, pan-Hellenic name has been superimposed on an autochthonous, non-Greek name."

== Swinburne's Erechtheus ==
Swinburne's classical tragedy Erechtheus was published in 1876. He uses the framework of the classical myth to express the republican and patriotic ideals that preoccupied him at this era.
