= Merope (mythology) =

Set of mythological Greek characters

Merope (Ancient Greek: Μερόπη, romanized: Merópē, lit. 'with her face turned'; pronounced /ˈmɛrəpiː/, MEH-roh-pee) was originally the name of several characters in Greek mythology.

- Merope, one of the 3,000 Oceanids, water-nymph daughters of the Titans Oceanus and his sister-wife Tethys. She married Clymenus, son of Helios, and had children with him: Phaethon and the girls called Heliades.
- Merope, one of the Pleiades, daughter of Atlas and Pleione.
- Merope, one of the Heliades, daughter of either Helios and Clymene or of Clymenus (Helios' son) and Merope, one of the Oceanids.
- Merope, an Athenian princess as the daughter of King Erechtheus of Athens and possibly Praxithea, daughter of Phrasimus and Diogenia. She may have been the mother of Daedalus. The latter was attributed to various parentage: (1) Eupalamus and Alcippe, (2) Metion and Iphinoe, (3) Phrasmede or (4) Palamaon.
- Merope, also called Aero, was the consort or daughter of Oenopion.
- Merope, a queen of Onchestus as the wife of King Megareus and mother of Hippomenes.
- Merope, a Dorian who became the foster mother of Oedipus; otherwise the wife of Polybus was also called Periboea.
- Merope, queen of Messenia, wife of Cresphontes and mother of Aepytus.
- Merope, one of the daughters of Pandareus and his wife Harmothoë, and thus sister to Aëdon and Cleothera. After the deaths of their parents, she and her sister Cleothera were taken care of by the goddesses Aphrodite, Hera, Artemis and Athena until strong winds carried them over and took them to the Erinyes, whom they served as maids.
