= Phrasimus =

In Greek mythology, Phrasimus or Phrasimos (Ancient Greek: Φράσιμος, romanized: Phrásimos) was the Athenian husband of Diogenia, daughter of the river-god Cephisus. The couple had a daughter named Praxithea who married Erechtheus of Athens.
