= Eupalamus =

In Greek mythology, Eupalamus (Ancient Greek: Εὐπαλάμου, romanized: Eupalamos, lit. 'handy', 'skillful' or' ingenious') was an Athenian prince. There are two versions of his genealogy. According to the first, Eupalamus was the son of Metion (son of King Erechtheus), and the father by Alcippe of Daedalus, Perdix and Metiadusa, wife of King Cecrops II. Alternatively, Erechtheus was the son of Praxithea, and became the father of Metion, father of Daedalus.
