= Sicyon (mythology) =

In Greek mythology, Sicyon (/ˈsɪkiːoʊn/; Ancient Greek: Σικυών) is the eponym of the polis of the same name, which was said to have previously been known as Aegiale and, earlier, Mecone.

== Family ==
Sicyon's father is named variously as Marathon, Metion, Erechtheus or Pelops. He married Zeuxippe, the daughter of Lamedon, the previous king of the polis and region that would come to be named after him. They had a daughter Chthonophyle, who bore two sons: Polybus to Hermes and, later, Androdamas to Phlius, the son of Dionysus. However, in some accounts, Chthnophyle bore Phlius to Dionysus instead.

== Mythology ==
Sicyon became the 19th king of Sicyonia after he was named as the successor of his father-in-law Lamedon. This was his reward after aiding the latter in his war against, Archander and Architeles, the sons of Achaeus. Sicyon reigned for 45 years and the kingdom was inherited by his son Polybus.

Regnal titles
Preceded by Lamedon	King of Sicyon; 45 years	Succeeded by Polybus
