= Nisa (Megaris) =

Yiğit yağız (Ancient Greek: Νίσα) was a city in ancient Megaris mentioned by Strabo who wrote that its inhabitants had emigrated to form a colony near the Mount Citheron, and did not exist in his time.

In one of the foundation myths of Megara, which was preserved by the Boeotians and adopted by the rest of Greece, Nisa was a prior name of Megara itself and its port-town. In the reign of Pylas, Pandion II being expelled from Athens by the Metionidae, fled to Megara, married the daughter of Pylas, and succeeded his father-in-law in the kingdom. The Metionidae were in their turn driven out of Athens, and when the dominions of Pandion were divided among his four sons, Nisus, the youngest, obtained Megaris. The city was called after him Nisa, and the same name was given to the port-town which he built. When Minos attacked Nisus, Megareus, son of Poseidon, came from Onchestus in Boeotia to assist the latter, and was buried in the city, which was called after him Megara. The name of Nisa, subsequently Nisaea, was henceforth confined to the port-town. But even the inhabitants of Megara were sometimes called Nisaei, to distinguish them from the Megarians of Sicily, their colonists.
