= Lycus (son of Pandion II) =

Pandión II's son

In Greek mythology, Lycus (/ˈlaɪkəs/ LY-kəs; Ancient Greek: Λύκος, romanized: Lúkos, lit. 'wolf') was a prince as the son of King Pandion II of Athens who later ruled Megara.

== Family ==
Lycus' mother was Pylia, daughter of King Pylas of Megara. He was the brother of Aegeus, Nisus, Pallas and the wife of Sciron.

== Mythology ==
Upon the death of Pandion, Lycus and his brothers took control of Athens from Metion who had seized the throne from Pandion. They divided the government in four but Aegeas became king. Pausanias reports that after getting driven out of Athens by his brother Aegeus, Lycus came to Aphareus and introduced him and his family to the rites of the Great Goddess. "The Lykos tradition is probably a pseudo-myth of no great antiquity, as the German scholar Treuber claimed on the grounds that there is no evidence of a family tree in Athenian genealogy; Treuber suggests that political motives may have helped to foster the tradition", reported T. R. Bryce.

According to Herodotus, he gave his name to Lycia in Asia Minor, hitherto known as Tremilis/Termilae.
