= Aegeus =

Mythical king of Athens

- King of Athens
- Member of the Athenian Royal Family
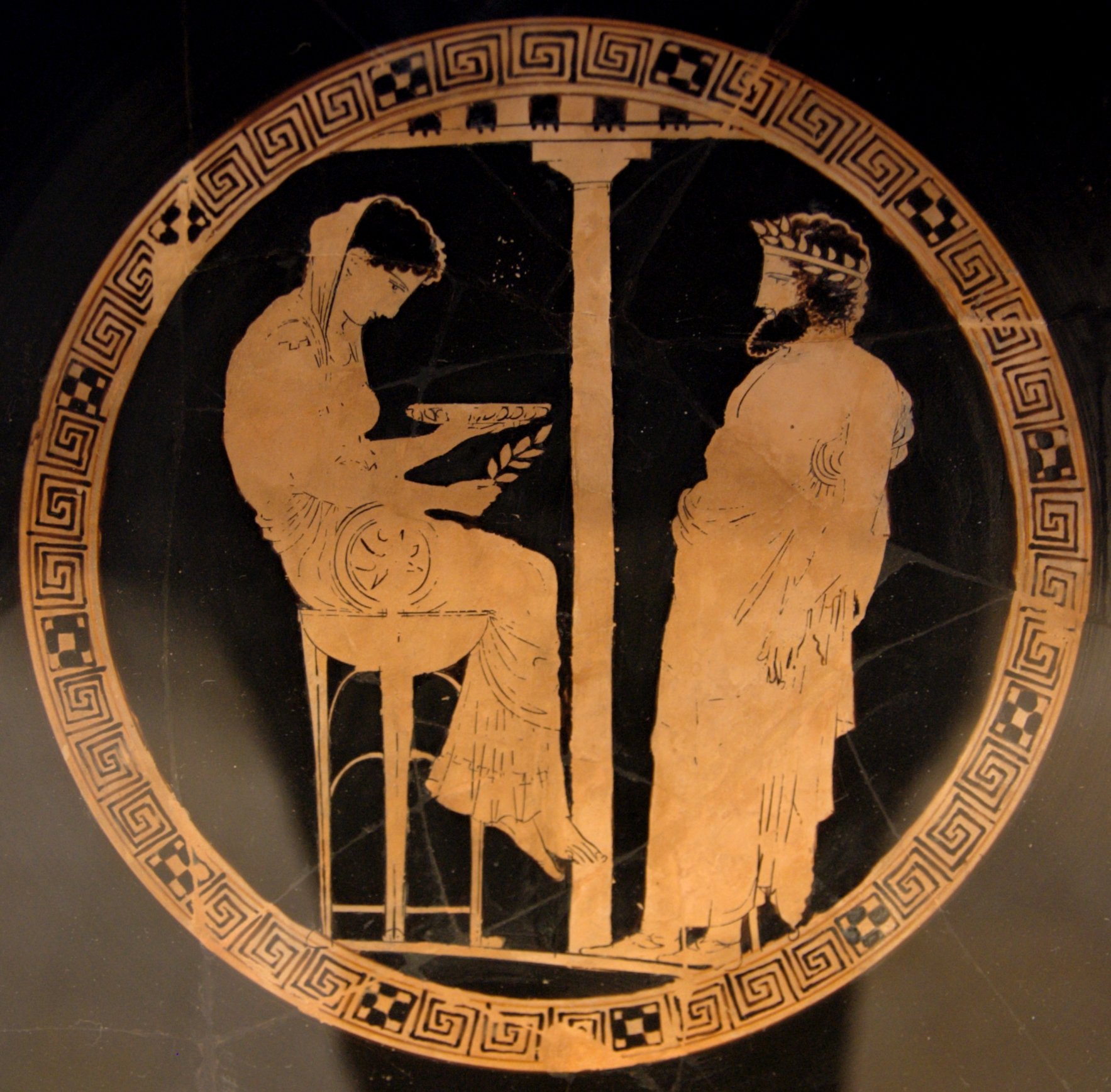
- Themis and Aegeus; Attic red-figure kylix, 440–430 BC
- Other names: Aegeas
- Predecessor: Pandion II
- Successor: Theseus
- Abode: Megara, then Athens

Genealogy
- Parents: (1) Pandion II and Pylia (2) Scyrius (3) Phemius
- Siblings: (1) Pallas, Nisus, Lycus and wife of Sciron
- Consort: (i) Meta (ii) Chalciope (iii) Aethra (iv) Medea (v) unknown
- Children: (iii) Theseus (iv) Medus (v) Pallas

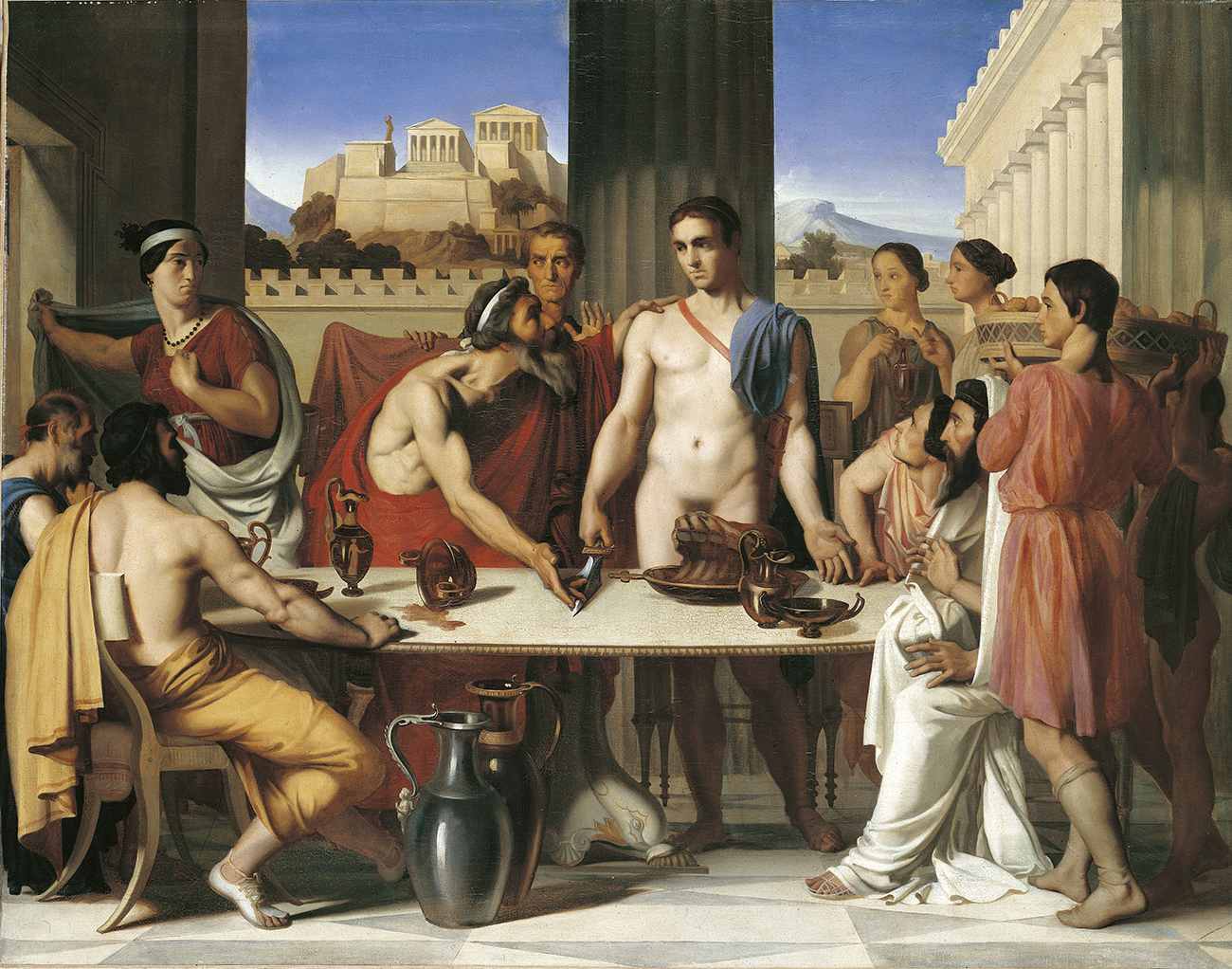
Theseus Recognized by his Father by Hippolyte Flandrin (1832)

Aegeus (/ˈiːdʒi.əs/, /ˈiːdʒuːs/; Ancient Greek: Αἰγεύς, romanized: Aigeús, lit. 'goat', 'shield' or 'protector') was one of the kings of Athens in Greek mythology, who gave his name to the Aegean Sea, was the father of Theseus, and founded Athenian institutions.

== Family ==
Aegeus was the son of Pandion II, king of Athens and Pylia, daughter of King Pylas of Megara and thus, brother to Pallas, Nysus, Lykos and the wife of Sciron. But, in some accounts, he was regarded as the son of Scyrius or Phemius and was not of the stock of the Erechtheids, since he was only an adopted son of Pandion.

Aegeus' first wife was Meta, daughter of Hoples and his second wife was Chalciope, daughter of Rhexenor, neither of whom bore him any children. He was also credited to be the father of Medus by the witch Medea. One of his wives was Autochthe of the House of Perseus, who gave him many daughters but no sons. In a rare account, Pallas was also said to be the son of Aegeus. The latter was also said to fathered Megareus, eponymous founder of Megara.

Aegeides (Αἰγείδης), was a patronymic from Aegeus and especially used to designate Theseus.

== Mythology ==
=== Reign ===
Aegeus was born in Megara, where his father Pandion II had settled after being expelled from Athens by the sons of Metion when they seized the throne. After Pandion’s death Aegeus, now king of Megara, collaborated with his three brothers to reclaim Athens, successfully taking control of the government and expelling the Metionid usurpers. The brothers divided power among themselves, with Aegeus succeeding Pandion as the new king of Attica. It is also believed that Megara was part of Attica at the time, and that Nisus received his part when he became king of that city. Lycus became king of Euboea whereas Pallas received the southern part of the territory. Aegeus, eldest of the brothers, received what they all regarded as the most valuable city: Athens.

The division of the land was explained further in the following text by the geographer Strabo:

... when Attica was divided into four parts, Nisus obtained Megaris as his portion and founded Nisaea. Now, according to Philochorus, his rule extended from the Isthmus to the Pythium, but according to Andron, only as far as Eleusis and the Thriasian Plain. Although different writers have stated the division into four parts in different ways, it suffices to take the following from Sophocles: Aegeus says that his father ordered him to depart to the shorelands, assigning to him as the eldest the best portion of this land; then to Lycus he assigns Euboea's garden that lies side by side therewith; and for Nisus he selects the neighboring land of Sceiron's shore; and the southerly part of the land fell to this rugged Pallas, breeder of giants.

Later on, Lycus was driven from the territory by Aegeus himself, and had to seek refuge in Arene, Messenia which was ruled by King Aphareus. Pallas and his fifty sons revolted at a later time, being crushed by Aegeus' son Theseus.

=== Heirless King ===
Still without a male heir with his previous marriages, Aegeus asked the oracle at Delphi for advice. According to Pausanias, Aegeus ascribed this misfortune to the anger of Aphrodite and in order to conciliate her introduced her worship as Aphrodite Urania (Heavenly) in Athens.

The cryptic words of the oracle were "Do not loosen the bulging mouth of the wineskin until you have reached the height of Athens, lest you die of grief." Aegeus did not understand the prophecy and was disappointed. This puzzling oracle forced Aegeus to visit Pittheus, king of Troezen, who was famous for his wisdom and skill at expounding oracles. Pittheus understood the prophecy and introduced Aegeus to his daughter, Aethra, when Aegeus was drunk. They lay with each other, and then in some versions, Aethra waded to the island of Sphairia (a.k.a. Calauria) and bedded Poseidon. When Aethra became pregnant, Aegeus decided to return to Athens. Before leaving, he buried his sandal, shield, and sword under a huge rock and told her that, when their son grew up, he should move the rock and bring the weapons to his father, who would acknowledge him. Upon his return to Athens, Aegeus married Medea, who had fled from Corinth and the wrath of Jason. Medea finally gave him one son named Medus.

When Theseus grew up, he found his father's belongings left for him and went to Athens to claim his birthright. Aegeus recognized him as his son by his sword, shield, and sandals. Medea, Aegeus' wife perceived Theseus to be a threat for her children's inheritance and first tried to discredit and then to poison Theseus. When Aegeus discovered these schemes, he drove Medea out of Athens.

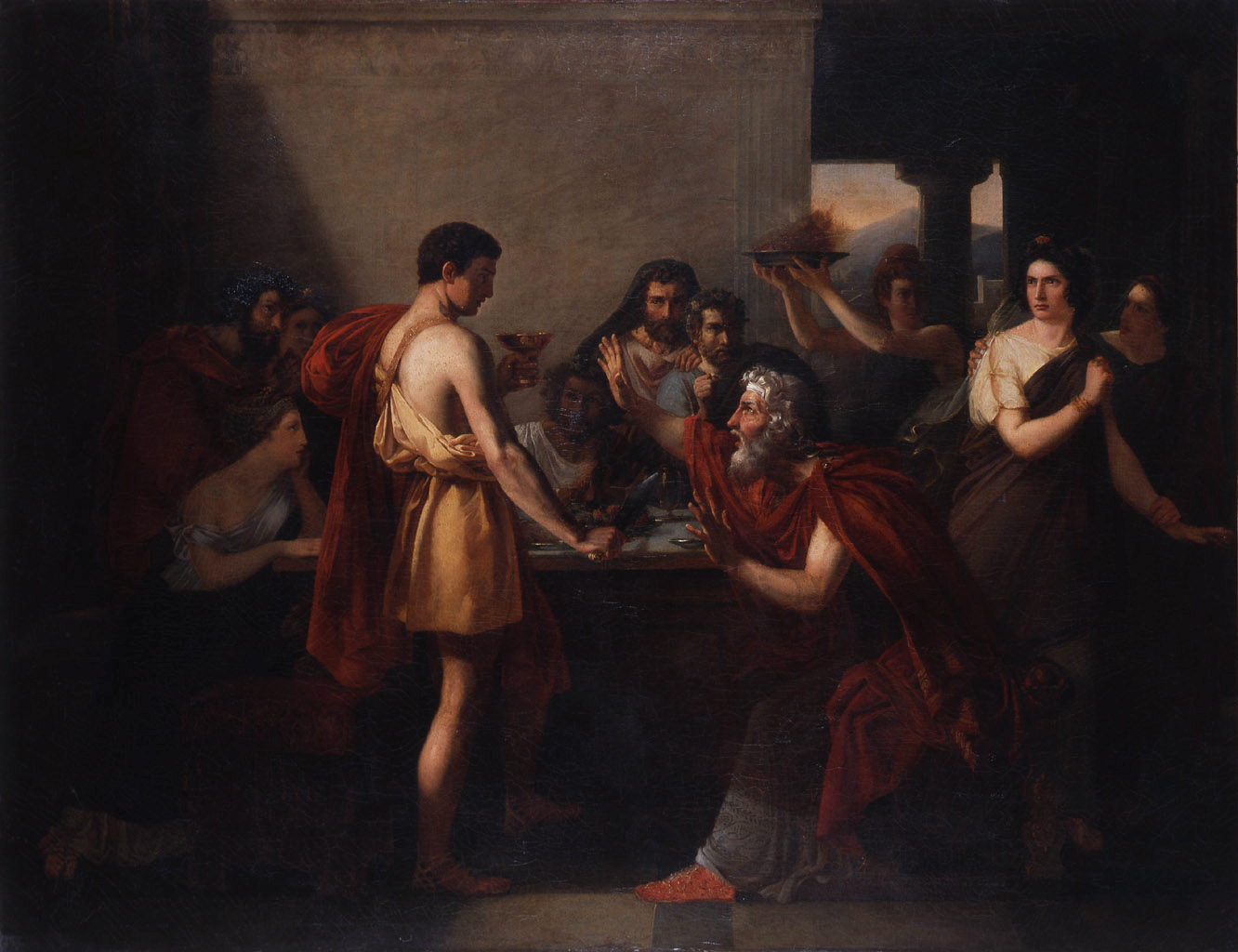
Thésée reconnu par son père by Antoine-Placide Gibert (1832)

=== Conflict with Crete ===
While visiting in Athens, King Minos' son, Androgeus managed to defeat Aegeus in every contest during the Panathenaic Games. Out of envy, Aegeus sent him to conquer the Marathonian Bull, which killed him. Minos was angry and declared war on Athens. He offered the Athenians peace, however, under the condition that Athens would send seven young men and seven young women every nine years to Crete to be fed to the Minotaur, a vicious monster. This continued until Theseus killed the Minotaur with the help of Ariadne, Minos' daughter.

After his adventures in Crete, Theseus returned by ship to Athens. His father, Aegeus previously had asked him to hang a white sail as a sign that Theseus is alive, but Theseus neglected this request. When Aegeus saw Theseus' ships without a white sail, he assumed the worst and threw himself in his grief into the sea, named after him the Aegean Sea.

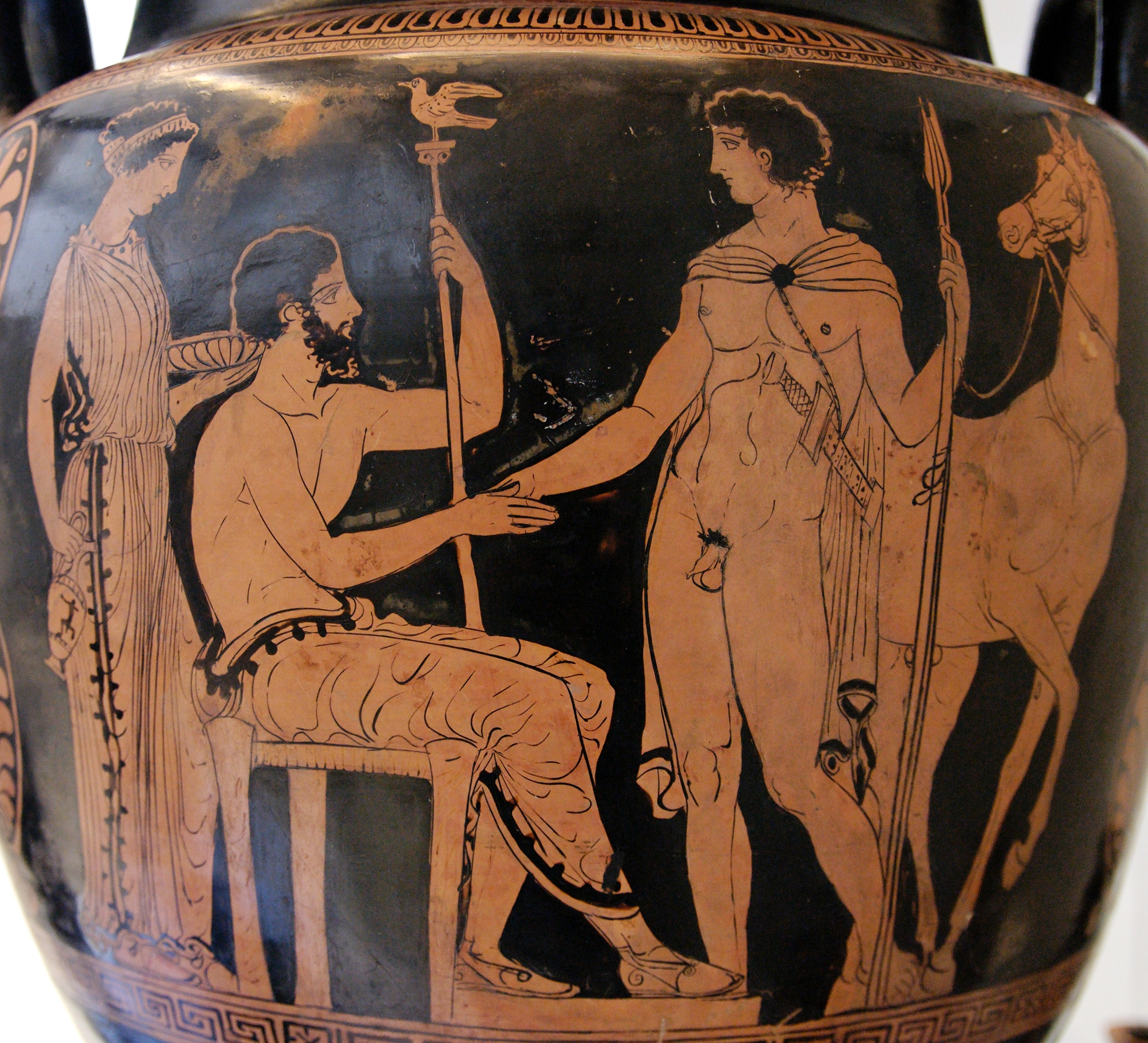
Arrival or departure of a young warrior or hero, maybe Theseus arriving at Athens and being recognized because of his sword by Aegeus. Apulian red-figured volute-krater, ca. 410–400 BC, from Ruvo (South Italy).

=== Theseus and the Minotaur ===
In Troezen, Theseus grew up and became a brave young man. He managed to move the rock and took his father's weapons. His mother then told him the identity of his father and that he should take the weapons back to him at Athens and be acknowledged. Theseus decided to go to Athens and had the choice of going by sea, which was the safe way, or by land, following a dangerous path with thieves and bandits all the way. Young, brave and ambitious, Theseus decided to go to Athens by land.

When Theseus arrived, he did not reveal his true identity. He was welcomed by Aegeus, who was suspicious about the stranger who came to Athens. Medea tried to have Theseus killed by encouraging Aegeus to ask him to capture the Marathonian Bull, but Theseus succeeded. She tried to poison him, but at the last second, Aegeus recognized his son and knocked the poisoned cup out of Theseus' hand. Father and son were thus reunited, and Medea was sent away to Asia.

Theseus departed for Crete. Upon his departure, Aegeus told him to put up white sails when returning if he was successful in killing the Minotaur. However, when Theseus returned, he forgot these instructions. When Aegeus saw the black sails coming into Athens, mistaken in his belief that his son had been slain, he killed himself by jumping from a height: according to some, from the Acropolis or another unnamed rock; according to some Latin authors, into the sea which was therefore known as the Aegean Sea.

Sophocles' tragedy Aegeus has been lost, but Aegeus features in Euripides' Medea.

== Legacy ==
At Athens, the traveller Pausanias was informed in the second-century CE that the cult of Aphrodite Urania above the Kerameikos was so ancient that it had been established by Aegeus, whose sisters were barren, and he still childless himself.

There was a heroon of Aigeus in Athens, called Aigeion (Αἰγεῖον).

== See also ==
- Catullus, LXIV.
- Plutarch, Theseus.

== Notes ==
Regnal titles
Preceded by Pandion II	King of Athens; 48 years	Succeeded by Theseus
