= Pylia (mythology) =

Daughter of Pylas in Greek mythology

In Greek mythology, Pylia (Ancient Greek: Πυλία) was a Megarian princess as the daughter of the Lelegian king, Pylas of Megara. In one account, she was called Peleia (Πελεία).

== Family ==
Pylia was the mother of the sons of Pandion II: Aegeus, Lycus, Nisus and Pallas, and possibly of a daughter who married her maternal uncle Sciron, the Megarian warlord and brother of Pylia.

== Mythology ==
Pylia was offered in marriage by Pylas to Pandion II who fled to her father in Megara after being expelled from Athens by his cousins, the Metionidae.
