= Nisaea =

Coordinates: 37°58′32″N 23°21′55″E

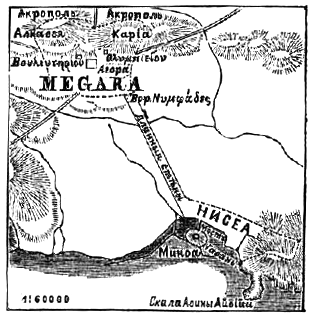
This map depicts the long walls which connected Nisaea to the ancient City State of Megara.

Nisaea or Nisaia (Ancient Greek: Νίσαια or Νισαία) was the Saronic port town of the ancient polis Megara. In Greek mythology, Nisaea was founded by one of Pandion II's sons, Nisos, who named the region given to him by his father Nisaea, after himself. Control of Nisaea slipped back and forth between Athens and Megara both before and during the Peloponessian War. Athenian allies of the Megarians built long walls which connected Nisaea to Megaris. According to Thucydides, the length of the walls that connected the port to Megara were eight Greek stadia, while Strabo claims the walls to have been 18 stadia in length. A temple of Demeter was located on the road near Nisaea, and a temple of Poseidon located within the port town. Nisaean Megara is thought to have been the birthplace of poet Theognis, but his birthplace is not known for certain The location of the ancient port town remains in debate by historians.

== Foundation myth ==
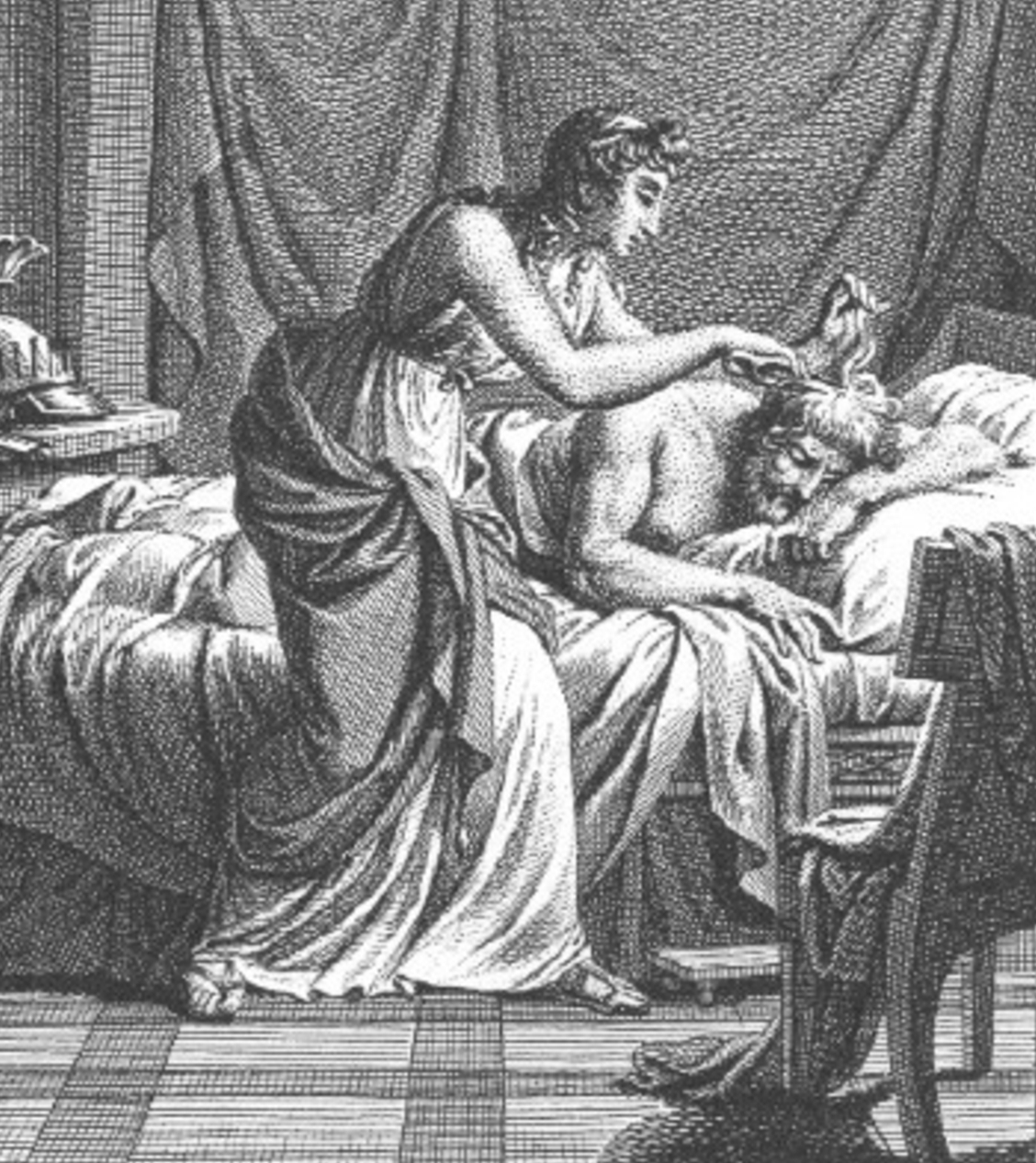
Scylla cutting the hair of her father Nisos. Sketch by Nicolas-André Monsiau (1754-1837).

During the reign of the mythical Athenian King Pylas, Pandion II fled to Megara where he then married Pylia, the daughter of Pylas. After Pylas was exiled from Athens for the murder of his uncle Bias, Pandion then succeeded his father-in-law as King of Athens. Pandion divided Attica into 4 regions, giving each of his 4 sons - Aigeus, Lykos, Pallas, and Nisos - reign over one of the regions. Pandion's son Nisos was awarded the Megarid, which Nisos then named Nisaea, after himself. When the King of Crete Minos attacked Nisaea, Megareus, son of Poseidon, came from Onchestus in Boeotia to assist Nisos in the war against Minos. Following the war, Megareus married Iphinoë, the daughter of Nisos. Megareus then succeeded Nisos on the throne, and Nisaea was renamed Megara after himself. The name of Nisaea was henceforth confined to only the port-town, while inhabitants of Megara were occasionally called Nisaei to distinguish them from the Megarians of Sicily, their colonists.

== History ==
In 561 BC, Peisistratos led an Athenian army to seize Nisaea, where he was successful. Salamis was very close to Nisaea, so Athenians frequently took control of the Megarian port. The Athenians were allies of Megara beginning c. 459 BC, and built two long walls connecting Megara with Nisaea. In 446 BC, the Megarians returned to the Peloponnesian League, and revolted against Athens. The Megarians allied with Peloponnesian troops, and together they overthrew and eliminated the Athenian garrisons in Megaris. The Athenians held Nisaea for a short period of time, but then surrendered it in the Thirty Years' Peace made with Sparta and Spartan allies.

=== Peloponnesian War ===
In the first years of the Peloponnesian War (431 BC), Nisaea was defeated in a naval battle against an Athenian fleet. Following their defeat, eight thousand Peloponnesian soldiers marched to Nisaea, and boarded 40 stolen Magarian ships at the port to attack Athenian strongholds. Following the attack, an Athenian fleet blockaded the harbour of Nisaea to prevent shipments from being received or sent out. In the fifth year of the war (427 BC), the Athenians under Nicias took possession of the island of Minoa, which allowed Athenian forces to seize full control over Nisaea. In the eighth year of the war (424 BC), the long walls which had acted as a Peloponnesian garrison were breached and Nisaea fell to the Athenians after a siege of two days. Nisaea became the port of Megara once again in 409 BC. The walls of Nisaea which had been damaged during the Peloponnesian war were rebuilt in 343 BC by Athenian army leader Phocion as a symbol of understanding between Megara and Athens.

== Culture ==
=== Resources and trade ===
Nisaea was the only Saronic port of Megara, and was used to ship resources across the gulf and receive resources as well. Aristophanes describes natural salt pans found on the coast near Nisaea, where salt was collected and exported to Athens. Megarians produced high quality wool used for clothing and winter attire which was shipped for trade from Nisaea over the Saronic gulf. Megarians profited significantly from the exports and imports which travelled through Nisaea.

=== Religion ===
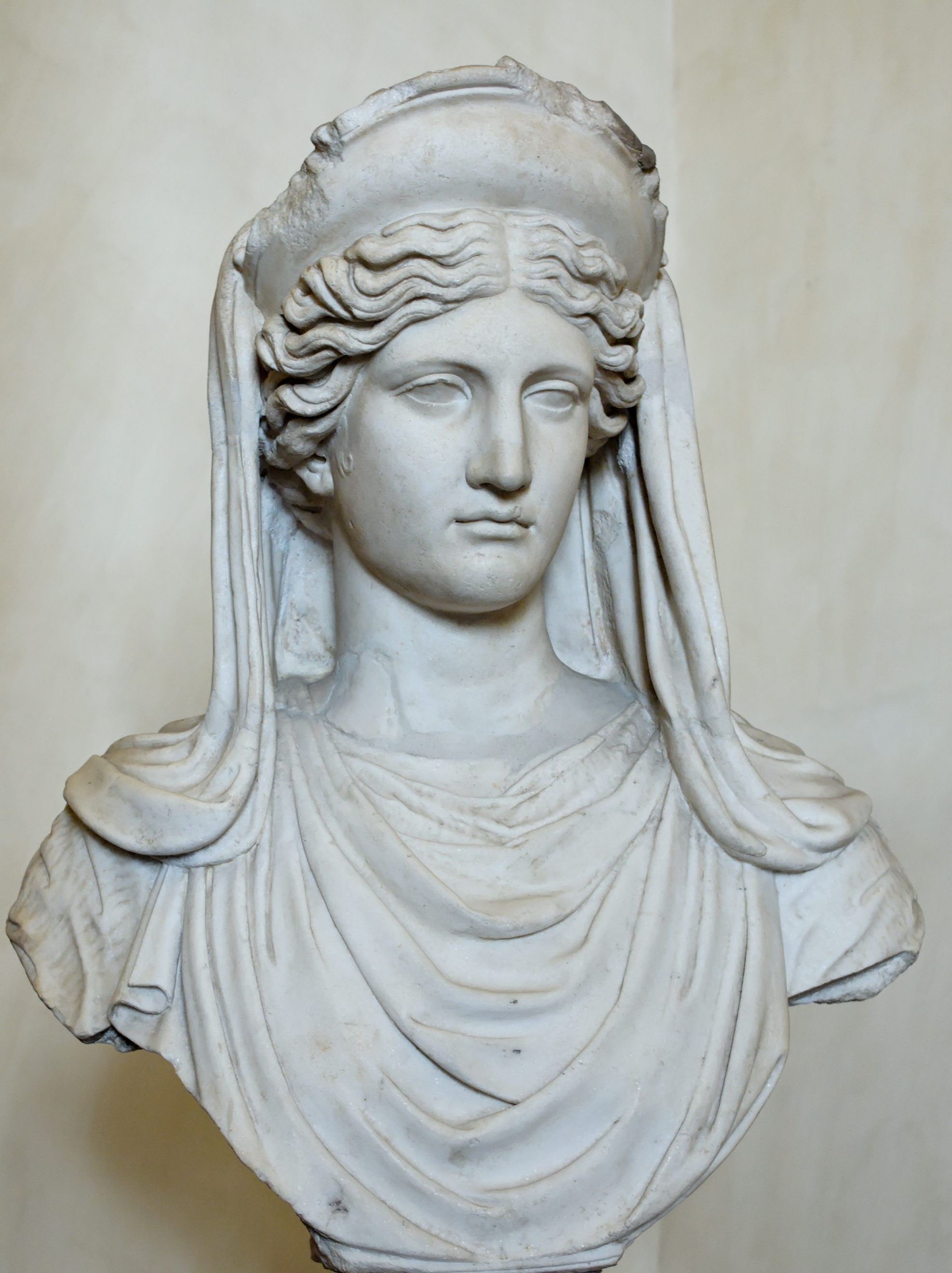
A Roman marble bust of the goddess Demeter from the National Roman Museum. The bust is a copy of the original Greek version from 4th century BCE.

Nisaea housed a temple dedicated to Poseidon, who was predominant to Megarian colonies. Thucidydes noted a shrine dedicated to Enaylius located near the harbour of the port town. A sanctuary of Demeter Malophoros was near Nisaea, which dated back to the Archaic period. An account by Pausanias describes how the roof of the Demeter Malophoros temple had collapsed due to deterioration. The cult of Demeter was brought to Nisaean Megara by colonists in the Archaic period. Neither locations of the temples are known, which is also the case for the location of Nisaea itself.

=== Poetry and prose ===
A poet by the name of Theognis is debated to have been from either Nisaean Megara or Megara Hyblaia in Sicily. Although significant figures such as Plato doubted that Theognis was from Nisaean Megara, Theognis' poetry about the Persian Wars is said to be distinctly Megarian, but his origin still remains uncertain. Historians consider it more likely that Theognis is from Nisaean Megara. The poet Semonides mentions the port as "the navel of the Nisaians" in another poem about the Persian Wars, which was believed to be written in the 5th century.

The second-century Greek writer Athenaeus preserves a fragment of the lost poem Georgica of Nicander in his The Deipnosophists. In this lost poem, Nicander declares the roses of Nisaea second only to Emanthian roses as the most fragrant and beautiful.

== Geography ==
Nisaea was the only known Megarian port on the coast of the Saronic Gulf. The exact site of Nisaea is debated because Thucydides' description of the coastal area of Nisaea does not describe the region as it is seen today. A theory of the location of Nisaea which considers the accounts of Strabo, Thucydides, and Pausanias, assumes that Nisaea was located in between Minoa and the mainland. The site of Nisaea has been thought to be located near modern Pachi, which has an Island similarly named Nisis Pachaki in close proximity to Pachi. Some historians also suggest that it is possible the coastal site has been washed away over time.

== Sources ==
- Fraser, J.G. Commentary, Pausanias's Description of Greece: Book 1: Attica (Macmillan, 1913).
- Smith, Philip J. The Archaeology and Epigraphy of Hellenistic and Roman Megaris, Greece (Oxford: 2008).
- Beck, Hans and Smith, Philip J. Megarian Moments, The Local World of an Ancient Greek City-State, (2018)
