= Pallas (son of Pandion) =

In Greek mythology, Pallas (/ˈpæləs/ PAL-əs; Ancient Greek: Πάλλας) was a member of the Athenian royal family.

== Family ==
Pallas was one of the four sons of the exiled King Pandion II of Athens and Pylia, daughter of King Pylas of Megara. He was the brother of Aegeus, Nisos, Lykos and the wife of Sciron.

== Mythology ==
Upon the death of Pandion, Pallas and his brothers took control of Athens from Metion, who had seized the throne from Pandion. They divided the government in four but Aegeas became king. Pallas received Paralia or Diacria as his domain, or else he shared the power over several demes with Aegeus. Later, after the death of Aegeas, Pallas tried to take the throne from the rightful heir, his nephew, Theseus, but failed and was killed by him, and so were his fifty children, the Pallantides.

In a version endorsed by Servius, Pallas was not a brother, but a son of Aegeus, and thus a brother of Theseus, by whom he was expelled from Attica. He then came to Arcadia, where he became king and founded a dynasty to which Evander and another Pallas belonged.
