= Pallas (mythology) =

List of Greek mythological figures

In Greek mythology, Pallas (/ˈpæləs/ PAL-əs; Ancient Greek: Πάλλας, gen. Πάλλαντος [masc.]; Παλλάς, gen. Παλλάδος [fem.]) may refer to the following figures:

Male:

- Pallas, the son of Megamedes and father of Selene in some versions, perhaps one of the following.
- Pallas, the son of Crius and Eurybia, brother of Astraeus and Perses, and husband of Styx.
- Pallas, a son of Uranus and Gaia, killed and flayed by Athena.
- Pallas, a teacher of Athena.
- Pallas, the son of Pandion II, king of Athens, and father of the 50 Pallantides.
- Pallas, the father of Euryalus by Diomede.
- Pallas, a prominent character in the Aeneid.

Female:

- Pallas, daughter of Triton and friend of Athena.
- Pallas, one of the epithets of the goddess Athena.
