= Alcyone (daughter of Sciron) =

Greek mythological person

In Greek mythology, Alcyone (Ancient Greek: Ἀλκυόνη, romanized: Alkuónē, lit. 'kingfisher') is a minor figure from Attica who was transformed into the bird bearing her name after she was murdered by her own father Sciron. Her tale is a variation on the more known myth of the origins of the kingfisher, starring Alcyone and Ceyx.

== Etymology ==
Alkyóne comes from alkyón (ἀλκυών), which refers to a sea-bird with a mournful song or to a kingfisher bird in particular. The meaning(s) of the words is uncertain because alkyón is considered to be of pre-Greek, non-Indo-european origin. However, folk etymology related them to the háls (ἅλς, "brine, sea, salt") and kyéo (κυέω, "I conceive").

Alkyóne originally is written with a smooth breathing mark, but this false origin beginning with a rough breathing mark (transliterated as the letter H) led to the common misspellings halkyón (ἁλκυών) and Halkyóne (Ἁλκυόνη), and thus the name of one of the kingfisher bird genus' in English Halcyon. It is also speculated that Alkyóne is derived from alké (ἀλκή, "prowess, battle, guard") and onéo (ὀνέω, from ὀνίνεμι, onínemi, "to help, to please").

== Mythology ==
According to Pseudo-Probus's commentary on Virgil, Alcyone was the daughter of an Attic man named Sciron, the son of Polypemon. Her father, who wished to see his daughter wed at last, ordered her to look for a husband, and Alcyone proceeded to sleep with many men. When he found out about his daughter's promiscuity, Sciron was enraged and cast Alcyone into the sea to drown, whereupon she was transformed into a kingfisher, an aquatic bird beloved by the sea-goddess Thetis.

== Attestation of the story ==
Pseudo-Probus says that the version with Sciron is Theodorus's, from a lost Metamorphoses work of his; he adds that Ovid in his own Metamorphoses is going by Nicander's version of the story (which has also been lost). Nicander was a second-century BC Greek poet and grammarian whose lost works about transformation myths heavily influenced later authors, including Ovid.

In the Metamorphoses, Ovid writes that Alcyone and Ceyx were a beloved couple. Ceyx died at sea during a terrible seastorm, and when Alcyone learnt of his demise, she threw herself off a cliff. The goddess of marriage Juno (Greek Hera), pitying the unfortunate couple, transformed them both into kingfishers, so they could still be together. This version of the story is also supported by Virgil, Apollodorus, and Hyginus. Pseudo-Probus, Ovid and Hyginus all make the metamorphosis the origin of the etymology for "halcyon days", the seven days in winter when storms never occur so the birds can lay their eggs.

Despite Ovid going by a different version than the one pseudo-Probus had in mind, he evidently knew (and referenced) both of them, albeit the other (the one concerning the daughter of Sciron) in a very subtle and obscure way in the lines:

Borne hence by her dragons sprung from Titans's blood, she entered the citadel of Pallas, which beheld [...] the granddaughter of Polypemon upborne by new-sprung wings.

— Ovid, Metamorphoses 7.398-401 (trans. Frank Justus Miller)

It is possible that the original myth was a simpler version closer to Nicander's one, where a woman named Alcyone wept for her unnamed husband and became the bird; Ceyx was probably added later due to him being an important figure in poetry, and having a wife named Alcyone (as evidenced from the lost Hesiodic epic poem The Wedding of Ceyx).

== See also ==
- Titus Andronicus
- Aerope
- Io
- Nyctaea

== Bibliography ==
- Apollodorus (1921). The Library. Loeb Classical Library 121. Vol. I: Books 1-3.9. Translated by James G. Frazer. Cambridge, MA: Harvard University Press.
- Beekes, Robert S. P. (2009). Lucien van Beek (ed.). Etymological Dictionary of Greek. Leiden Indo-European Etymological Dictionary Series. Vol. 1. Leiden, the Netherlands: Brill Publications. ISBN 978-90-04-17420-7.
- Forbes Irving, Paul M. C. (1990). Metamorphosis in Greek Myths. Clarendon Press. ISBN 0-19-814730-9.
- Gildenhard, Ingo (July 5, 2017). Transformative Change in Western Thought: A History of Metamorphosis from Homer to Hollywood. Routledge. ISBN 978-1-907975-01-1.
- Hyginus, Gaius Julius, The Myths of Hyginus. Edited and translated by Mary A. Grant, Lawrence: University of Kansas Press, 1960.
- Liddell, Henry George; Scott, Robert (1940). A Greek-English Lexicon, revised and augmented throughout by Sir Henry Stuart Jones with the assistance of Roderick McKenzie. Oxford: Clarendon Press. Online version at Perseus.tufts project.
- Mitsis, Phillip; Ziogas, Ioannis (July 28, 2016). Wordplay and Powerplay in Latin Poetry. Germany: De Gruyter. ISBN 978-3-11-047252-3.
- Ovid (1916). Metamorphoses. Loeb Classical Library 42. Vol. I: Books 1-8. Translated by Frank Justus Miller, revised by G. P. Goold. Cambridge, MA: Harvard University Press. ISBN 9780674990463.
- Ovid (1916). Metamorphoses. Loeb Classical Library 43. Vol. II: Books 9-15. Translated by Frank Justus Miller, revised by G. P. Goold. Cambridge, MA: Harvard University Press. ISBN 9780674990470.
- Pagès, Joan; Villagra, Nereida (May 9, 2022). Myths on the Margins of Homer: Prolegomena to the Mythographus Homericus. De Gruyter. ISBN 9783110751154.
- Valerius Probus, In Vergillii Bucolica et Georgica Commentarius, 1848. Online version on Google books.
- Virgil (1916). Eclogues. Georgics. Aeneid: Books 1-6. Loeb Classical Library 63. Translated by H. Rushton Fairclough, revised by G. P. Goold. Cambridge, MA: Harvard University Press.
