= Meta (mythology) =

In Greek mythology, Meta (Ancient Greek: Μήτα, lit. 'beyond') was the daughter of Hoples, son of Ion, Eponym of the Ionians. In other traditions, Meta was called Melite.

== Mythology ==
Meta was the first wife of Aegeus, king of Athens. She bore no child to the king thus he married another woman named Chalciope, daughter of Rhexenor or Chalcodon, who also could not give him an heir to the throne. Eventually, the hero Theseus became Aegeus' first born by Aethra after the Athenian ruler was made drunk by Pittheus, the maiden's daughter.
