= Marcus Valerius Probus =

1st century Roman grammarian and critic

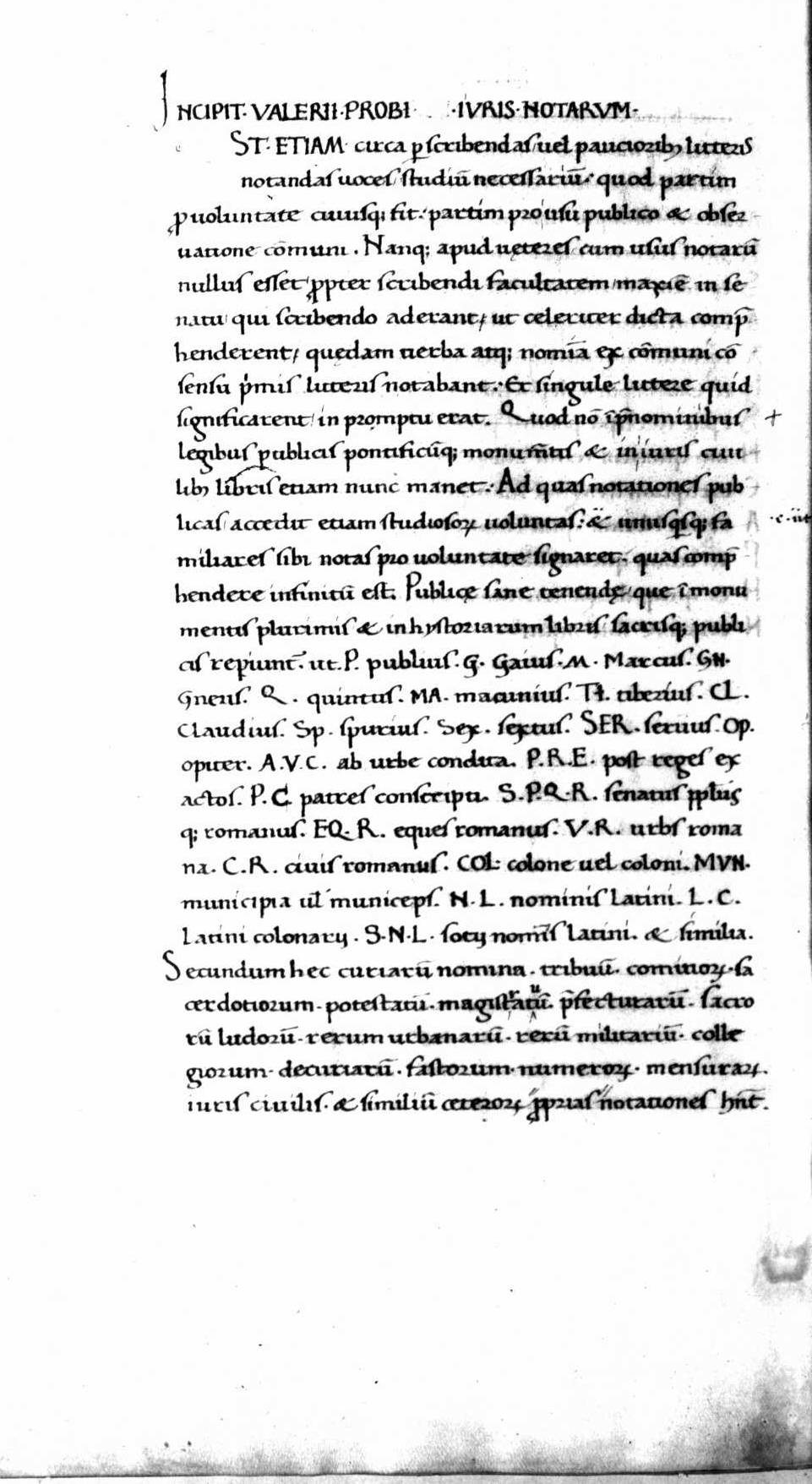
Probus, Marcus Valerius – De iuris notarum, fragm., 15th-century – BEIC 14822487.

Marcus Valerius Probus, sometimes called Berytius or Probus the Berytian (c. 20/30 – 105 AD), was a Roman grammarian and critic, who flourished during Nero's reign.

He was a student rather than a teacher, and devoted himself to the criticism and elucidation of the texts of classical authors (especially the most important Roman poets) by means of marginal notes or by signs, after the manner of the Alexandrine grammarians. In this way, he treated Horace, Lucretius, Terence and Persius, the biography of the latter being probably taken from Probus's introduction to his edition of the poet. With the exception of these texts, he published little, but his lectures were preserved in the notes taken by his pupils. Some of his criticisms on Virgil may be preserved in the commentary on the Bucolics and Georgics which goes under his name. Part of one of his treatises, De notis, has also been preserved (probably an excerpt from a larger work). It contains a list of abbreviations used in official and historical writings (especially proper names), in laws, legal pleadings and edicts.

== See also ==
- Pseudo-Probus
