= Theognis of Megara =

6th-century BC Greek lyric poet

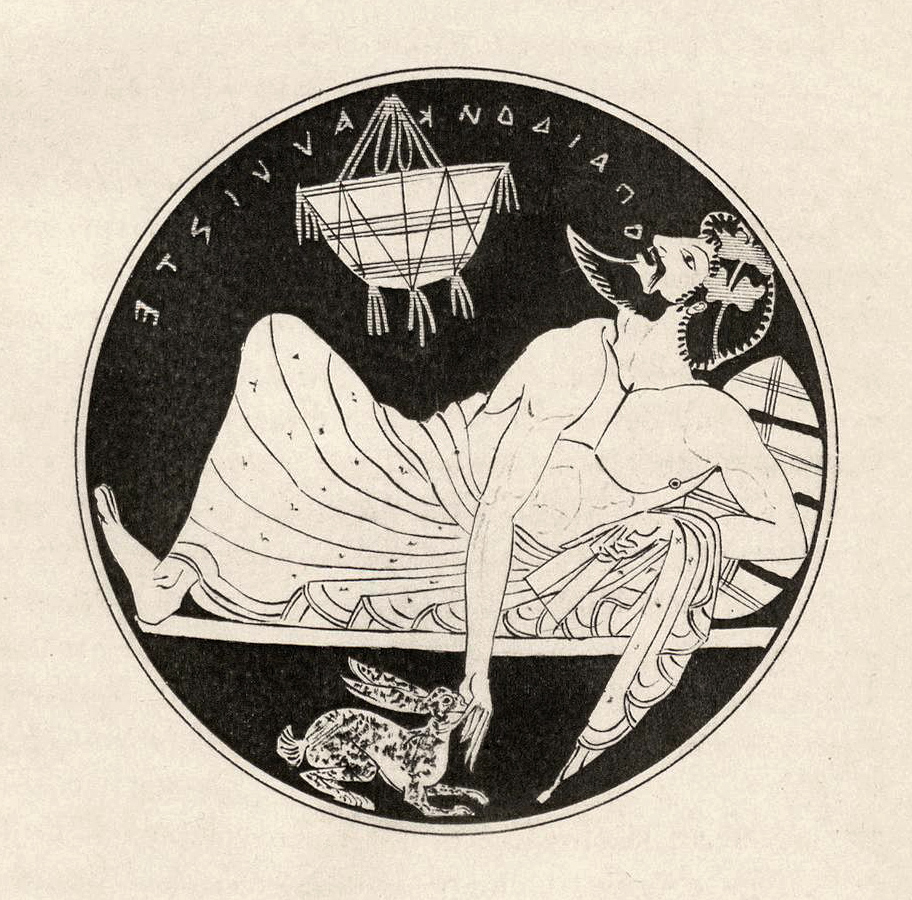
Drawing of a kylix from Tanagra, Boeotia, c. 500 BC. A symposiast sings ὦ παίδων κάλλιστε, the beginning of a verse by Theognis

Theognis of Megara (Ancient Greek: Θέογνις ὁ Μεγαρεύς, Théognis ho Megareús) was a Greek lyric poet active in approximately the sixth century BC. The work attributed to him consists of gnomic poetry quite typical of the time, featuring ethical maxims and practical advice about life. He was the first Greek poet known to express concern over the eventual fate and survival of his own work and, along with Homer, Hesiod and the authors of the Homeric Hymns, he is among the earliest poets whose work has been preserved in a continuous manuscript tradition (the work of other archaic poets is preserved as scattered fragments).

More than half of the extant elegiac poetry of Greece before the Alexandrian period is included in the approximately 1,400 lines of verse attributed to him, though several poems traditionally attributed to him were composed by others, e.g. Solon and Euenus. Some of these verses inspired ancient commentators to value him as a moralist yet the entire corpus is valued today for its "warts and all" portrayal of aristocratic life in archaic Greece.

The verses preserved under Theognis' name are written from the viewpoint of an aristocrat confronted by social and political revolution typical of Greek cities in the archaic period. Part of his work is addressed to Cyrnus, who is presented as his erōmenos. The author of the poems celebrated him in his verse and educated him in the aristocratic values of the time, yet Cyrnus came to symbolize much about his imperfect world that the poet bitterly resented:

πᾶσι δ᾽ ὅσοισι μέμηλε καὶ ἐσσομένοισιν ἀοιδὴ
:ἔσσῃ ὁμῶς, ὄφρ᾽ ἂν γῆ τε καὶ ἠέλιος,
αὐτὰρ ἐγὼν ὀλίγης παρὰ σεῦ οὐ τυγχάνω αἰδοῦς,
:ἀλλ᾽ ὥσπερ μικρὸν παῖδα λόγοις μ᾽ ἀπατᾷς.

Translation:

To all to whom there is pleasure in song and to people yet unborn
You also will be a song, while the earth and sun remain,
Yet I am treated by you without even the least mark of respect
And, as if I were a child, you have deceived me with words.

In spite of such self-disclosures, almost nothing is known about Theognis the man: little is recorded by ancient sources and modern scholars question the authorship of most of the poems preserved under his name.

== Life ==
Ancient commentators, the poems themselves and even modern scholars offer mixed signals about the poet's life. Some of the poems respond in a personal and immediate way to events widely dispersed in time.

Ancient sources record dates in the mid-sixth century—Eusebius dates Theognis in the 58th Olympiad (548–45 BC), Suda the 59th Olympiad (544–41 BC) and Chronicon Paschale the 57th Olympiad (552–49 BC)—yet it is not clear whether Suda in this case means a date of birth or some other significant event in the poet's life. Some scholars have argued that the sources could have derived their dates from lines 773–82 under the assumption that these refer to Harpagus’s attack on Ionia in the reign of Cyrus The Great.

Chronological evidence from the poems themselves is hampered by their uncertain authenticity. Lines 29–52, if composed by Theognis, seem to portray the political situation in Megara before the rise of the tyrant Theagenes, about the latter half of the seventh century, but lines 891–95 describe a war in Euboea in the second quarter of the sixth century, and lines 773–82 seem to refer to the Persian invasion of mainland Greece in the reign of Xerxes, at the end of the first quarter of the fifth century.

Even some modern scholars have interpreted those lines in that time-frame, deducing a birth date on or just before 600 BC, while others place his birth around 550 BC to fit in with the Persian invasion under either Darius or Xerxes.

There is confusion also about his place of birth, "Megara", which Plato for example understood to be Megara Hyblaea in Sicily, while a scholiast on Plato cites Didymus for the rival theory that the poet was born in a Megara in Attica, and ventures the opinion that Theognis might have later migrated to the Sicilian Megara (a similar theory had assigned an Attic birthplace to the Spartan poet Tyrtaeus).

Modern scholars in general opt for a birthplace in mainland Greek Megara though a suitable context for the poems could be found just about anywhere in archaic Greece and there are options for mix-and-match, such as a birth in mainland Megara and then migration to Sicilian Megara (lines 1197–1201 mention dispossession/exile and lines 783–88 journeys to Sicily, Euboea and Sparta).

The elegiac verses attributed to Theognis present him as a complex character and an exponent of traditional Greek morality. Thus for example Isocrates includes him among "the best advisers for human life", although all consider words of advice both in poetry and in prose to be most useful, they certainly do not derive the greatest pleasure from listening to them, but their attitude towards them is the same as their attitude towards those who admonish: for although they praise the latter, they prefer to associate with those who share in their follies and not with those who seek to dissuade them.

As proof, one could cite the poetry of Hesiod, Theognis and Phocylides; for people say that they have been the best advisers for human life, but while saying this they prefer to occupy themselves with one another's follies than with the precepts of those poets."—Isocrates, To Nicocles 42–4, cited and translated by Douglas E. Gerber, Greek Elegiac Poetry, Loeb Classical Library (1999), page 171–3. In the Meno, Plato's Socrates cites some Theognidean verses to dismiss the poet as a confused and self-contradictory sophist whose teachings are not to be trusted. In 1982, historian David A. Campbell excuses self-contradictions as typical of a lifelong poet writing over many years and at the whim of inspiration.

The Theognidea might in fact be a collection of elegiac poems by different authors (see Modern scholarship below) and the "life" that emerges from them depends on which poems editors consider authentic.

Two modern authorities have drawn these portraits of Theognis, based on their own selections of his work:

... a man of standing in his city, whose public actions however arouse some discontent; a man who sings to his drinking-comrades of his anxieties about the political situation; a man of cliques who finds himself betrayed by those he trusted, dispossessed of his lands in a democratic revolution, an impoverished and embittered exile dreaming of revenge.

— Martin Litchfield West

One forms a clear impression of his personality, sometimes high-spirited but more often despondent, and cynical even in his love poetry; a man of strong feelings and candid in their expression.

— David A. Campbell

== Work ==
=== Transmission ===
It was probably his reputation as a moralist, significant enough to deserve comment by Aristotle and Plato, that guaranteed the survival of his work through the Byzantine period. However, it is clear that we do not possess his total output. The Byzantine Suda, for example, mentions 2800 lines of elegiacs, twice the number preserved in medieval manuscripts. Different scholars have different theories about the transmission of the text to account for the discrepancy. The surviving manuscripts of Theognis preserve an anthology of ancient elegy, including selections from other elegists such as Tyrtaeus; scholars disagree over which parts were written by Theognis. The collection is preserved in more than forty manuscripts, comprising a continuous series of elegiac couplets that modern editors now separate into some 300 to 400 "poems", according to personal preferences.

The best of these manuscripts, dated to the early 10th century, includes an end section titled "Book 2" (sometimes referred to as Musa Paedica), which features some hundred additional couplets and which "harps on the same theme throughout—boy love." The quality of the verse in the end section is radically diverse, ranging from "exquisite and simple beauty" to "the worst specimens of the bungler's art", and many scholars have rejected it as a spurious addition, including the philosopher Friedrich Nietzsche (see Nietzsche and Theognis below).

However, many modern scholars consider the verses of Book 2 an integral part of the collection. The rest of the work also raises issues about authenticity, since some couplets look like lines attributed by ancient sources to other poets (Solon, Euenus, Mimnermus and Tyrtaeus). (Note: Solon (lines 315–18, 585–90), Euenus (lines 467–96, 667–82, 1341–50), Mimnermus (lines 795–56, 1020–22) and Tyrtaeus (lines 1003–6),) and other couplets are repeated with few or no changes elsewhere in the text. (Note: Repeated lines: 87–90≈1082cf, 116≈644, 39–42≈1081–82b, 209–10≈332ab, 509–10≈211–12, 853–54≈1038ab, 877–78≈1070ab, 415–18≈1164eh, and including Book Two 1151–52≈1238ab.) Ironically, Theognis mentions to his friend Cyrnus precautions that he has taken to ensure the fidelity of his legacy:

"Cyrnus, as I compose my poems for you, let a seal be placed on the verses; if stolen they will never pass undetected nor will anyone exchange their present good content for worse, but everyone will say: They are the verses of Theognis of Megara, a name known to all mankind."—lines 19–23

The nature of this seal and its effectiveness in preserving his work is much disputed by scholars (see Modern scholarship below).

=== Subject matter ===
All the poetry attributed to Theognis deals with subjects typically discussed at aristocratic symposia—drinking parties that had symbolic and practical significance for the participants:

Authors as distant from each other as Theognis and Plato agree in seeing the symposium as a model for the city, a gathering where men may examine themselves in a playful but nonetheless important way. Here we should note the repeated use of the word βάσανος ('touchstone', 'test': Theog. 415–18, 447–52, 1105–6, 1164; Pl. Laws 649d10, 650a2, 650b4) to describe the symposium. Moreover at the symposium poetry plays a significant part in teaching the participants the characteristics required of them to be good men.—N.T. Croally

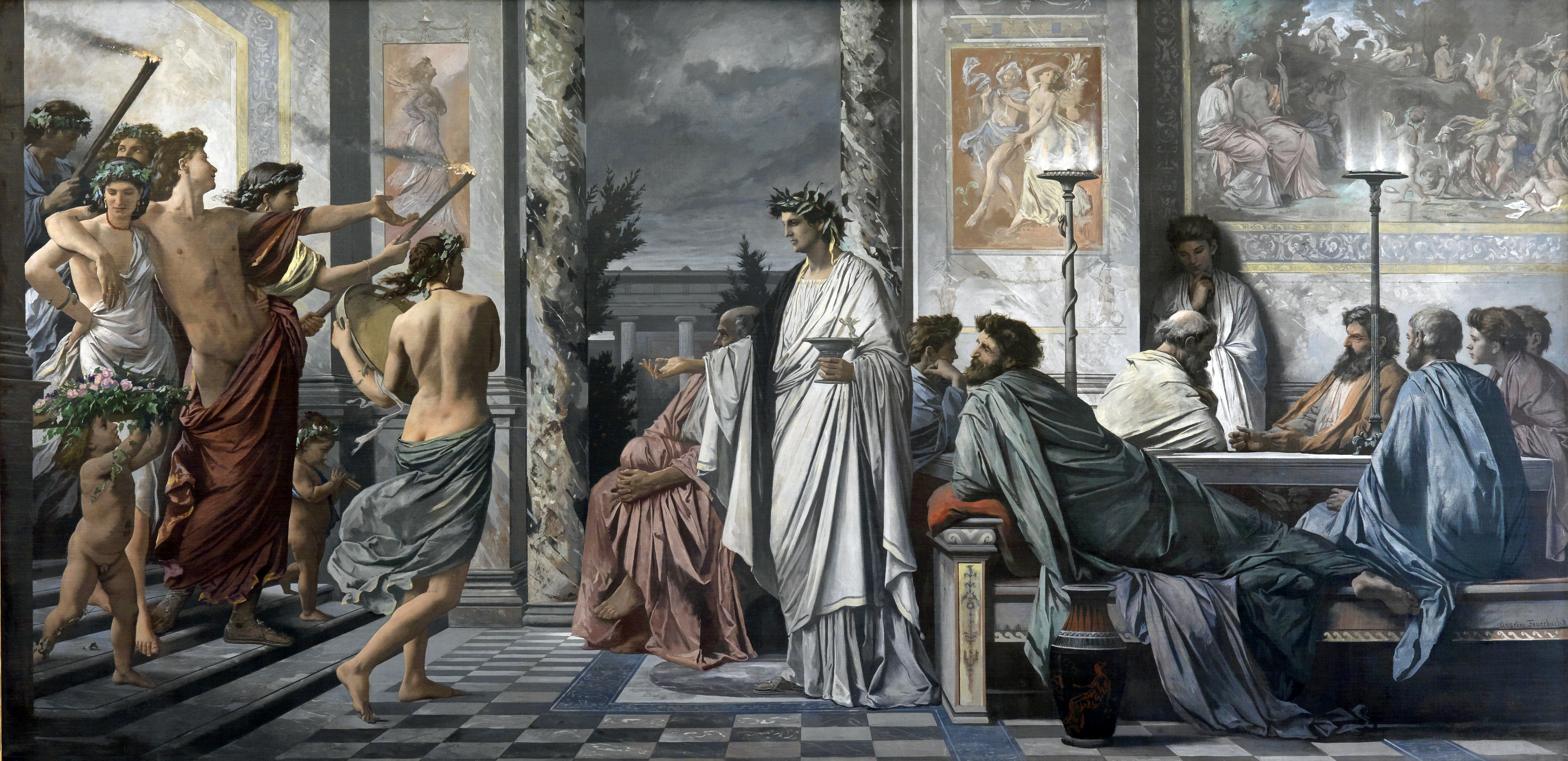
A scene from Plato's philosophical work The Symposium by Anselm Feuerbach

Sympotic topics covered by Theognis include wine, (Note: Example of a wine-theme: "Two demons of drink beset wretched mortals, enfeebling thirst and harsh drunkenness. I'll steer a middle course between them and you won't persuade me either not to drink or to drink too much."—lines 837–40, translated by Douglas Gerber, Loeb, page 295) politics, (Note: Example of political theme: "Cyrnus, this city is pregnant and I am afraid she will give birth to a man who will set right our wicked insolence. The townsmen are still of sound mind but their leaders have changed and fallen into the depths of depravity."—lines 39–42, translated by Douglas Gerber, Loeb, page 181) friendship, (Note: Example of friendship theme: "Many in truth are your comrades when there's food and drink, but not so many when the enterprise is serious."—lines 115–16, translated by Douglas Gerber, Loeb page 189) war, (Note: Example of war theme: "This is excellence, this the best human prize and the fairest for a man to win. This is a common benefit for the state and all the people, whenever a man with firm stance holds his ground among the front ranks."—lines 1003–6 (also attributed to Tyrtaeus), translated by Douglas Gerber, Loeb page 319) life's brevity, (Note: Example of carpe diem theme: "Enjoy your youth, my dear heart: soon it will be the turn of other men, and I'll be dead and become dark earth."—lines 877–78, translated by Douglas Gerber, Loeb, page 301) human nature, (Note: Example of human nature theme: "It is easier to beget and rear a man than to put good sense in him. No one has yet devised a means whereby one has made the fool wise and a noble man out of one who is base."—lines 429–31, translated by Douglas Gerber, Loeb page 237) wealth (Note: Example of Wealth theme: "O wretched poverty, why do you delay to leave me and go to another man? Don't be attached to me against my will, but go, visit another house, and don't always share this miserable life with me.—lines 351–54, translated by Douglas Gerber, Loeb page 225) and love. (Note: Example of a love theme: "Don't show affection for me in your words but keep your mind and heart elsewhere, if you love me and the mind within you is loyal. Either love me sincerely or renounce me, hate me and quarrel openly,"—lines 87–90, translated by Douglas Gerber, Loeb page 187) Distinctions are frequently made between "good" (ἐσθλοί) and "bad" (κακοί), a dichotomy based on a class distinction between aristocrats and "others", typical of the period but usually implicit in the works of earlier poets such as Homer—"In Theognis it amounts to an obsession". The verses are addressed to Cyrnus and other individuals of unknown identity, such as Scythes, Simonides, Clearistus, Onomacritus, Democles, Academus, Timagoras, Demonax and Argyris and "Boy". Poems are also addressed to his own heart or spirit, and deities such as Zeus, Apollo, Artemis, Castor and Pollux, Eros, Ploutos, the Muses and Graces.

Theognis also details the heightened political tensions within Megara during the seventh century. His works depict the arrival of "other men" that have challenged and displaced former members of the elite. His works, particularly lines 53–58, demonstrate that increasing urbanization among the rural populace surrounding Megara has resulted in heightened social pressures within the city. His writings are thought by modern scholars to largely represent the aristocratic viewpoint of the Megarian elite. However, it is difficult for modern scholars to ascertain both Theognis' position in Megarian society and his role in writing these lines due to possible later additions to his works and the confusion surrounding his origins.

=== Poetic style ===
Theognis wrote in the archaic elegiac style. An "elegy" in English is associated with lamentation. In ancient Greece it was a much more flexible medium, suitable for performance at drinking parties and public festivals, urging courage in war and surrender in love. It gave the hexameter line of epic verse a lyrical impulse by the addition of a shorter "pentameter" line, in a series of couplets accompanied by the music of the aulos or pipe.

Theognis was conservative and unadventurous in his use of language, frequently imitating the epic phrasing of Homer, even using his Ionian dialect rather than the Dorian spoken in Megara, and possibly borrowing inspiration and entire lines from other elegiac poets, such as Tyrtaeus, Mimnermus and Solon. His verses are not always melodious or carefully constructed but he often places key words for good effect and he employs linguistic devices such as asyndeton, familiar in common speech.

He was capable of arresting imagery and memorable statements in the form of terse epigrams. Some of these qualities are evident in the following lines [425-8], considered to be "the classic formulation of Greek pessimism":

Πάντων μὲν μὴ φῦναι ἐπιχθονίοισιν ἄριστον,

μηδ᾽ ἐσιδεῖν αὐγὰς ὀξέος ἠελίου.

φύντα δ᾽ ὅπως ὤκιστα πύλας Ἀΐδαο περῆσαι

καὶ κεῖσθαι πολλὴν γῆν ἐπαμησάμενον.

Translation:

Best of all for mortal beings is never to have been born at all
Nor ever to have set eyes on the bright light of the sun
But, since he is born, a man should make utmost haste through the gates of Death
And then repose, the earth piled into a mound round himself.

The lines were much quoted in antiquity, as for example by Stobaeus and Sextus Empiricus, and it was imitated by later poets, such as Sophocles and Bacchylides. (Note: Stobaeus 4.52, Sextus Empiricus Pyrrh. hypot. 3.231, Sophocles O.C 1225 and Bacchylides 5.160–2—cited by David Campbell, Greek Lyric Poetry page 366) Theognis himself might be imitating others: each of the longer hexameter lines is loosely paraphrased in the shorter pentameter lines, as if he borrowed the longer lines from some unknown source(s) and added the shorter lines to create an elegiac version. The last line could be imitating an image from Homer's Odyssey (5.482), where Odysseus covers himself with leaves though some scholars think the key word ἐπαμησάμενον might be corrupted. (Note: ... δοιοὺς δ' ἄρ' ὑπήλυθε θάμνους ἐξ ὁμόθεν πεφυῶτας· ὁ μὲν φυλίης, ὁ δ' ἐλαίης. τοὺς μὲν ἄρ' οὔτ' ἀνέμων διάη μένος ὑγρὸν ἀέντων, οὔτε ποτ' ἠέλιος φαέθων ἀκτῖσιν ἔβαλλεν, οὔτ' ὄμβρος περάασκε διαμπερές· ὣς ἄρα πυκνοὶ ἀλλήλοισιν ἔφυν ἐπαμοιβαδίς· οὓς ὑπ' Ὀδυσσεὺς δύσετ'. ἄφαρ δ' εὐνὴν ἐπαμήσατο χερσὶ φίλῃσιν εὐρεῖαν· φύλλων γὰρ ἔην χύσις ἤλιθα πολλή Odyssey 5.476–83) The smothering accumulation of eta (η) sounds in the last line of the Greek is imitated here in the English by mound round.

== Scholarship ==
=== Classical ===
According to Diogenes Laërtius, the second volume of the collected works of Antisthenes includes a book entitled Concerning Theognis. The work does not survive.

=== Modern ===
The field of Theognidean studies is battle-scarred, strewn with theories dead or dying, the scene of bitter passions and blind partisanship...combat has been continuous, except for interruptions due to real wars.
—David A. Campbell

The collection of verses attributed to Theognis has no overall structure, being a continuous series of elegiac couplets featuring frequent, sudden changes in subject and theme, in which different people are addressed and even the speaker seems to change persona, voicing contradictory statements and, on a couple of occasions, even changing sex. (Note: A woman's voice for example here: "My friends betray me and refuse to give me anything when men appear. Well, of my own accord I'll go out at evening and return at dawn, when the roosters awake and crow"—lines 861–64 translated by Douglas Gerber, Loeb page 299) It looks like a miscellaneous collection by different authors (some verses are in fact attributed elsewhere to other poets) but it is not known when or how the collection was finalized.

Friedrich Gottlieb Welcker, sometime known as "the father of Theognidean criticism", was the first modern scholar to edit the collection with a view to separating authentic verses from spurious additions (1826), Ernest Harrison (Studies in Theognis 1902) subsequently defended the authenticity of the collection, and thus the scholarly world divided into two camps, which one recent scholar half-jokingly referred to as "separatists" and "unitarians"

There have also been divisions within the camps. Separatists have agreed with Theodor Bergk (1843) that the collection was originally assembled as the work of Theognis, into which a large admixture of foreign matter has somehow found its way, or they have believed it was compiled originally as a textbook for use in schools or else as a set of aristocratic drinking songs, in which some verses of Theognis happen to be strongly represented.

In 1978, Martin Litchfield West identified 306 lines as a core sequence of verses that can be reliably attributed to Theognis since they contain mention of Cyrnus and are attested by 4th century authorities such as Plato and Aristotle, though the rest of the corpus could still contain some authentic verses. West acknowledges that the whole collection is valuable since it represents a cross-section of elegiac poetry composed in the sixth and early fifth centuries.

According to another view, the quest for authentically Theognidean elegies is rather beside the point—the collection owes its survival to the political motivations of Athenian intellectuals in the 5th and 4th century, disappointed with democracy and sympathetic to old aristocratic values: "The persona of the poet is traditionally based, ideologically conditioned and generically expressed." According to this view, the verses were drinking songs in so far as the symposium was understood to be a microcosm of society, where multiple views were an aspect of adaptive behaviour by the embattled aristocracy, and where even eroticism had political symbolism: "As the polis envisaged by Theognis is degenerate, erotic relationships are filled with pain..."

In lines 19–22, the poet announces his intention of placing a "seal" on the verses to protect them from theft and corruption. The lines are among the most controversial in Theognidean scholarship and there is a large body of literature dedicated to their explanation. The 'seal' has been theorized to be the name of Theognis or of Cyrnus or, more generally, the distinct poetic style or else the political or ethical content of the 'poems', or even a literal seal on a copy entrusted to some temple, just as Heraclitus of Ephesus was said once to have sealed and stored a copy of his work at the Artemisium.

==== Friedrich Nietzsche ====
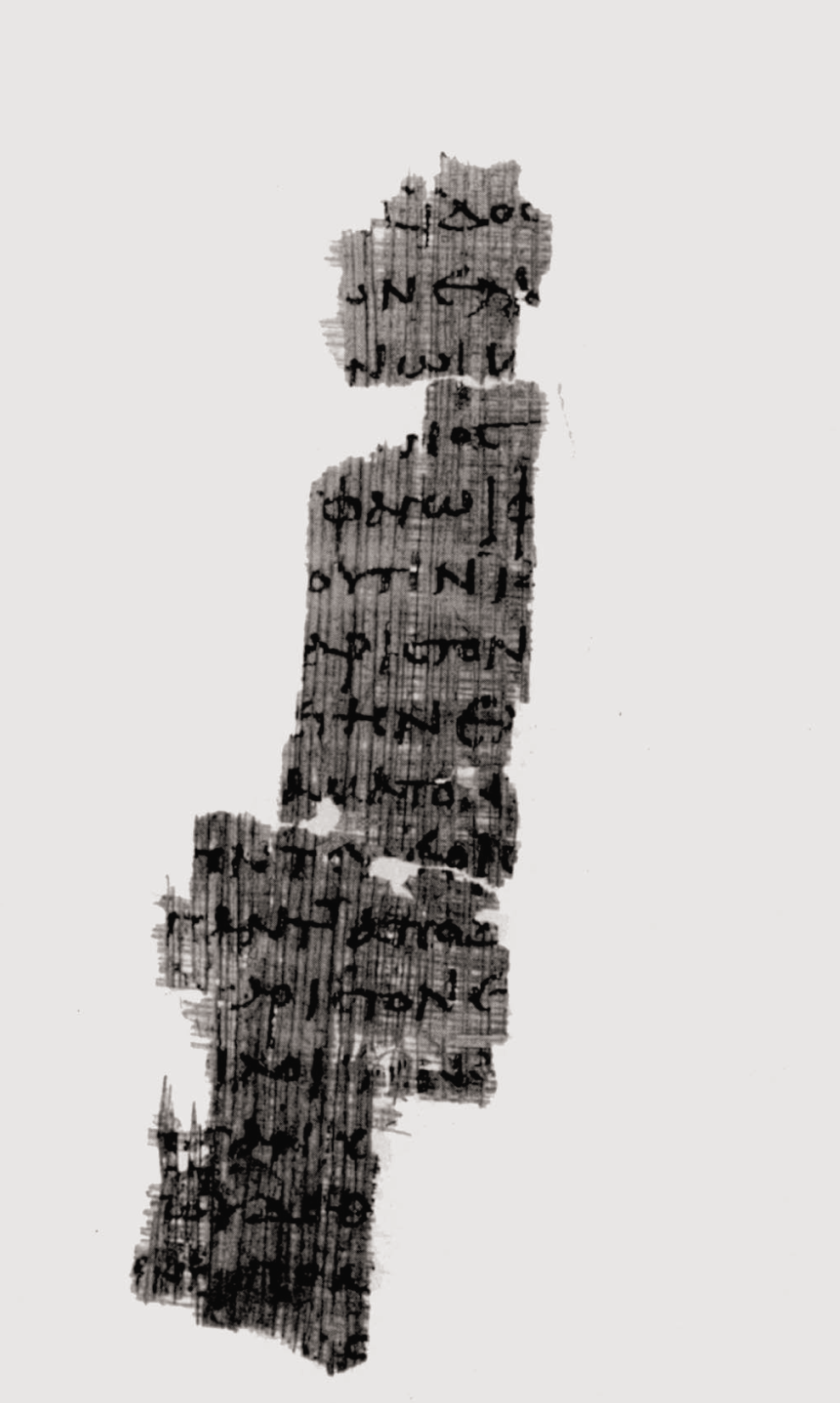
A papyrus fragment covering lines 917–33, part of a poem addressed to Democles (identity unknown) and considered on textual grounds to be a late addition to the Theognidean corpus, probably fifth century Coincidentally, Nietzsche's first published article, On the History of the Collection of the Theognidean Anthology (1867), concerned the textual transmission of the poems.

Friedrich Nietzsche, the German philosopher, already studied the work of Theognis during his school days at Schulpforta, the subject of his thesis entitled De Theognide Megarensi, an activity which he continued during his studies at Leipzig University. His first published article (in an influential classical journal, Rheinisches Museum) concerned the historical transmission of the collected verses. Nietzsche was an ardent exponent of "catchword theory", which explains the arrangement of the Theognidean verses as pairs of poems, each pair linked by a shared word or catchword that could be placed anywhere in either poem, as for example in these pairs:

lines 1–10 ("child of God") and lines 11–14 ("daughter of God");
lines 11–14 ("daughter of God) and lines 15–18 ("daughters of God");
lines 15–18 ("word") and lines 19–26 ("words") etc.

However a later scholar has observed that the catchword principle can be made to work for just about any anthology as a matter of coincidence due to thematic association.

Nietzsche valued Theognis as an archetype of the embattled aristocrat, describing him as "...a finely formed nobleman who has fallen on bad times", and "a distorted Janus-head" at the crossroads of social change. (Note: "Theognis appears as a finely formed nobleman who has fallen on bad times...full of fatal hatred toward the upward striving masses, tossed about by a sad fate that wore him down and made him milder in many respects. He is a characteristic image of that old, ingenious somewhat spoiled and no longer firmly rooted blood nobility, placed at the boundary of an old and a new era, a distorted Janus-head, since what is past seems so beautiful and enviable, that which is coming—something that basically has an equal entitlement—seems disgusting and repulsive; a typical head for all those noble figures who represent the aristocracy prior to a popular revolution and who struggle for the existence of the class of nobles as for their individual existence."—from a biography of Nietzsche by Curt Paul Zanz, quoted and translated by Maudemarie Clark and Alan Swensen in their edition, On the Genealogy of Morality: a polemic, Hackett Publishing Company (1998), page 133) Not all the verses in the collection however fitted Nietzsche's notion of Theognis, the man, and he rejected Musa Paedica or "Book 2" as the interpolation of a malicious editor out to discredit him. In one of his seminal works, On the Genealogy of Morality, he describes the poet as a 'mouthpiece' of the Greek nobility: Theognis represents superior virtues as traits of the aristocracy and thus distinguishes (in Nietzsche's own words) the "truthful" aristocrat from the "lying common man".

==== Charles Darwin ====
Charles Darwin represented a widespread preference for a biological interpretation of such statements when he commented on the above lines thus:

The Grecian poet, Theognis ... saw how important selection, if carefully applied, would be for the improvement of mankind. He saw likewise that wealth often checks the proper action of sexual selection.
—Charles Darwin
