= Pseudo-Probus =

4th century grammarian

Pseudo-Probus was a 4th-century AD grammarian of Latin. He wrote a number of books on the subject. All are misattributed to Marcus Valerius Probus, including:

1. Catholica Probi, on the declension of nouns, the conjugation of verbs, and the rhythmic endings of sentences. This is now generally regarded as the work of the grammarian Marius Plotius Sacerdos (3rd century).
2. Instituta artium, on the eight parts of speech, also called Ars vaticana (after the Vatican, where it was found). As mention is made in it of the Baths of Diocletian, it cannot be earlier than the 4th century. It is possibly by a later Probus, whose existence is, however, problematical.
3. Appendix Probi, dealing with the noun, the use of cases, rules of orthography (valuable in reference to the pronunciation of Latin at the time), and a table of Differentiae. As the author has evidently used the Institute, it also must be assigned to a late date.
4. De nomine excerpta, a compilation from various grammatical works.
5. De ultimis syllabis ad Caelestinum, a work explaining the quantities and other features of word-endings in the Latin language.

He also wrote at least one text on the author Vergil.
