= Theagenes of Megara =

Ancient Greek ruler of Megara (7th c. BC)

Theagenes of Megara (Ancient Greek: Θεαγένης ὁ Μεγαρεύς) ruled the ancient Greek city of Megara in the seventh century BC. The only sources for his life are anecdotes recorded by authors several centuries after his death, whose reliability is uncertain. Although very little is known of his life, he is considered one of the archetypal early Greek tyrants (tyrannoi).

== Life ==
Aristotle claims that Theagenes of Megara convinced the Megarians to give him a bodyguard, which he then used to seize control of the city. Elsewhere Aristotle claims that Theagenes came to power by slaughtering the flocks of the rich by a river. It is unclear how reliable these stories are: the bodyguard is a stereotypical trope in accounts of ancient tyrants' seizures of power and the meaning of the slaughter of the flocks is disputed. Aristotle presents the event as an example of a tyrant gaining power by intervening in social conflict between the rich aristocracy and the poor masses on the side of the latter. Recent scholarship has suggested that this interpretation may be anachronistic and questioned whether such social conflict actually existed in archaic Megara. Greg Anderson suggests that it was part of Theagenes' efforts to assert his dominance over the Megaran aristocracy, while Thomas Figueira has proposed that the episode reflects a religious conflict over the ownership of sacred flocks.

The geographer Pausanias attributes a fountain in Megara to Theagenes, as well as the long underground aqueduct that fed it. He said that it was "worth seeing for its size and ornament and the number of columns." Archaeologists have unearthed this fountain, but the surviving structure dates to the early fifth century BC. It thus cannot be the work of Theagenes, although it is possible that there was an earlier structure on the same site which was.

Thucydides states that Theagenes married his daughter to Cylon of Athens, a victor in the Olympic Games. Having consulted the Delphic Oracle, Cylon decided to take control of Athens by seizing the Acropolis during the Olympic Games in 630 BC, with a force provided by Theagenes. The attempt was unsuccessful; Cylon and his followers were besieged and killed. It is unclear what the consequences were for Theagenes and Megara. Some scholars connect the failure of this enterprise with Theagenes' fall from power. Plutarch says that Theagenes was overthrown and exiled, but he does not say how this happened. After his expulsion Megara was ruled by an oligarchy.

Theagenes is also mentioned in Aristophanes' Peace. When the chorus are persuading Trygaeus not to sacrifice a fat swine because they would be associating with the 'swinishness' of Theagenes.

== Bibliography ==
- Stein-Hölkeskamp, E. (2009). "The Tyrants". In Raaflaub, Kurt A.; van Wees, Hans (eds.). A Companion to Archaic Greece. Malden, MA: Wiley-Blackwell. pp. 100–116.
- Oost, Stewart Irvin (1973). "The Megara of Theagenes and Theognis". Classical Philology. 68 (3): 186–196. doi:10.1086/365976. S2CID 162187770.
