= Pagae =

Town of ancient Megaris

Coordinates: 38°05′00″N 23°11′18″E

Pagae or Pagai (/ˈpædʒiː/; Doric Greek: Παγαί), or Pegae or Pegai (Ancient Greek: Πηγαί) was a town of ancient Megaris, on the Alcyonian or Corinthian Gulf. According to some sources of greek mythology Pagae had been the home town of Tereus. It was the harbour of Megaris on the western coast, and was the most important place in the country next to the capital. According to Strabo it was situated on the narrowest part of the Megaric isthmus, the distance from Pagae to Nisaea being 120 stadia. When the Megarians joined Athens in 455 BCE, the Athenians garrisoned Pagae, and its harbour was of service to them in sending out an expedition against the northern coast of Peloponnesus. The Athenians retained possession of Pagae a short time after Megara revolted from them in 454 BCE; but, by the thirty years' truce made in the same year, they surrendered the place to the Megarians. At one period of the Peloponnesian War (424 BCE) we find Pagae held by the aristocratical exiles from Megara. Pagae continued to exist until a late period, and under the Roman emperors was a place of sufficient importance to coin its own money. Strabo calls it τὸ τῶν Μεγαρέων φρούριον. Pausanias visited in the 2nd century and saw there a chapel of the hero Aegialeus, who fell at Glisas in the second expedition of the Argives against Thebes, but who was buried at this place. He also saw near the road to Pagae, a rock covered with marks of arrows, which were supposed to have been made by a body of the Persian cavalry of Mardonius, who in the night had discharged their arrows at the rock under the impulse of Artemis, mistaking it for the enemy. In commemoration of this event, there was a brazen statue of Artemis Soteira at Pagae. From 193 BCE Pagae was a member of the Achaean League. Pagae is also mentioned in other ancient sources, including Ptolemy, Stephanus of Byzantium, Pomponius Mela, Pliny the Elder, Hierocles, and the Tabula Peutingeriana, where it is called Pache.

Its site is located near the modern Alepochori. Remains of the city walls can be seen today.

== Sources ==
- Smith, Philip J. The Archaeology and Epigraphy of Hellenistic and Roman Megaris, Greece (Oxford: 2008).
