= Nisos =

Greek mythological figure

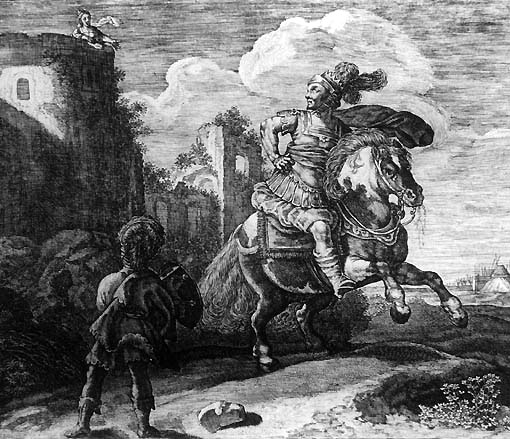
17th-century engraving of Nisos's daughter Scylla falling in love with his enemy Minos.

In Greek mythology, Nisos or Nisus (Ancient Greek: Νῖσος, romanized: Nîsos, lit. 'island') was a king of Megara.

== Family ==
Nisos was one of the four sons of Pandion II, King of Athens, and Pylia, daughter of King Pylas of Megara. He was the brother of Aegeas, Pallas and Lykos. He also had a sister who married Sciron. According to Hyginus, Nisos's father was the god Ares while other authors affirmed that he was the offspring of Deion.

Nisos was married to Abrota, sister of Megareus, and when she died, Nisos commanded that the Megarian women should wear clothes like she had. His daughter Eurynome, with Poseidon, had the famous son Bellerophon. The second daughter Iphinoe married Megareus, her maternal uncle. Lastly, the third princess Scylla was responsible for Nisos' death.

== Mythology ==
=== Early days ===
Metion, the uncle of Nisos, had seized the throne from Pandion II. However, upon their father's death, Nisos and his brothers returned to Athens and took back control. They drove out the sons of Metion, put Aegeus on the throne, and divided the government in four. Aegeas became king of Athens, and Nisos the King of Megara.

=== War with Minos ===
Minos, King of Crete, attacked Nisos's kingdom during a war with Athens over the death of his son Androgeus. Nisos, however, had a lock of purple hair that kept him safe from harm. Eros caused his daughter Scylla to fall in love with Minos. In one version, Minos tempts Scylla with a golden necklace to betray and kill her father. In another version, she fell in love with Minos from a distance, and after cutting off the purple lock, she presented it to Minos. However, Minos was disgusted with her act, calling her a disgrace. As Minos's ships set sail, Scylla attempted to climb up one of them. But Nisos, who had turned into a sea eagle or osprey, attacked her. His daughter transformed into a bird as well. There is also a version with Ares. According to another account, Nisos killed himself when he lost his vital lock of hair.

== See also ==
- Byzas
