= Pandion II =

Legendary king of Athens

In Greek mythology, Pandion II (/ˈpændiən/ or /ˈpændiɒn/; Ancient Greek: Πανδίων) was a legendary King of Athens, the son and heir of King Cecrops II and his wife Metiadusa, daughter of Eupalamus.

== Family ==
Pandion was the father of Aegeus, Pallas, Nisos, Lycus and the wife of Sciron by Pylia, daughter of King Pylas of Megara. He had a bastard son, Oeneus, who became the eponymous hero of the Attic tribe of Oineis.

== Mythology ==
Pandion II was the eighth king of Athens in the traditional line of succession as given by the third century BC Parian Chronicle, the chronographer Castor of Rhodes (probably from the late third-century Eratosthenes) and the Bibliotheca. He was preceded by Cecrops I, Cranaus, Amphictyon, Erichthonius, Pandion I, Erechtheus, and Cecrops II, and succeeded by Aegeus and Theseus. Castor gives his reign as 25 years (1307/6–1282/1). Originally there may have been a single Pandion, and either Pandion I or Pandion II may have been a later invention in order to fill a gap in the mythical history of Athens. Pausanias calls this Pandion the father of Procne and Philomela, usually considered to be the daughters of Pandion I.

Pandion was exiled from Athens by the sons of his uncle Metion who sought to put Metion on the throne. Pandion fled to Megara where he married Pylia, daughter of King Pylas. Later, Pylas went into voluntary exile to Messenia, because he had killed his uncle, Bias. Pylas then arranged for his son-in-law to be king of Megara. Pylia bore Pandion his four sons. When Pandion died at Megara, Nisos succeeded him as king. He had a hero shrine at Megara at the Bluff of Athene the Diver-bird. After this death, his other sons returned to Athens and drove out the sons of Metion, putting Aegeus on the throne.

Either Pandion II or Pandion I was usually identified with Pandion, the eponymous hero of the Attic tribe Pandionis.

Regnal titles
Preceded by Cecrops II	King of Athens; 25 years	Succeeded by Aegeus

== See also ==
- Sanctuary of Pandion
