= Pylas =

Mythical founder of Pylos, Greece

In Greek mythology, Pylas (Ancient Greek: Πύλας), also called Pylon or Pylos, was a king of Megara and successor of his father Cteson, son of Lelex.

== Mythology ==
After having slain Bias, his own paternal uncle, Pylas founded the town of Pylos in the Peloponnese. He gave Megara to Pandion who had married his daughter Pylia, and accordingly was his son-in-law.

Pylon was also the father of Sciron, the warlord of Megara.
