= Megara =

Historic town in Greece

Megara Μέγαρα
- Municipality
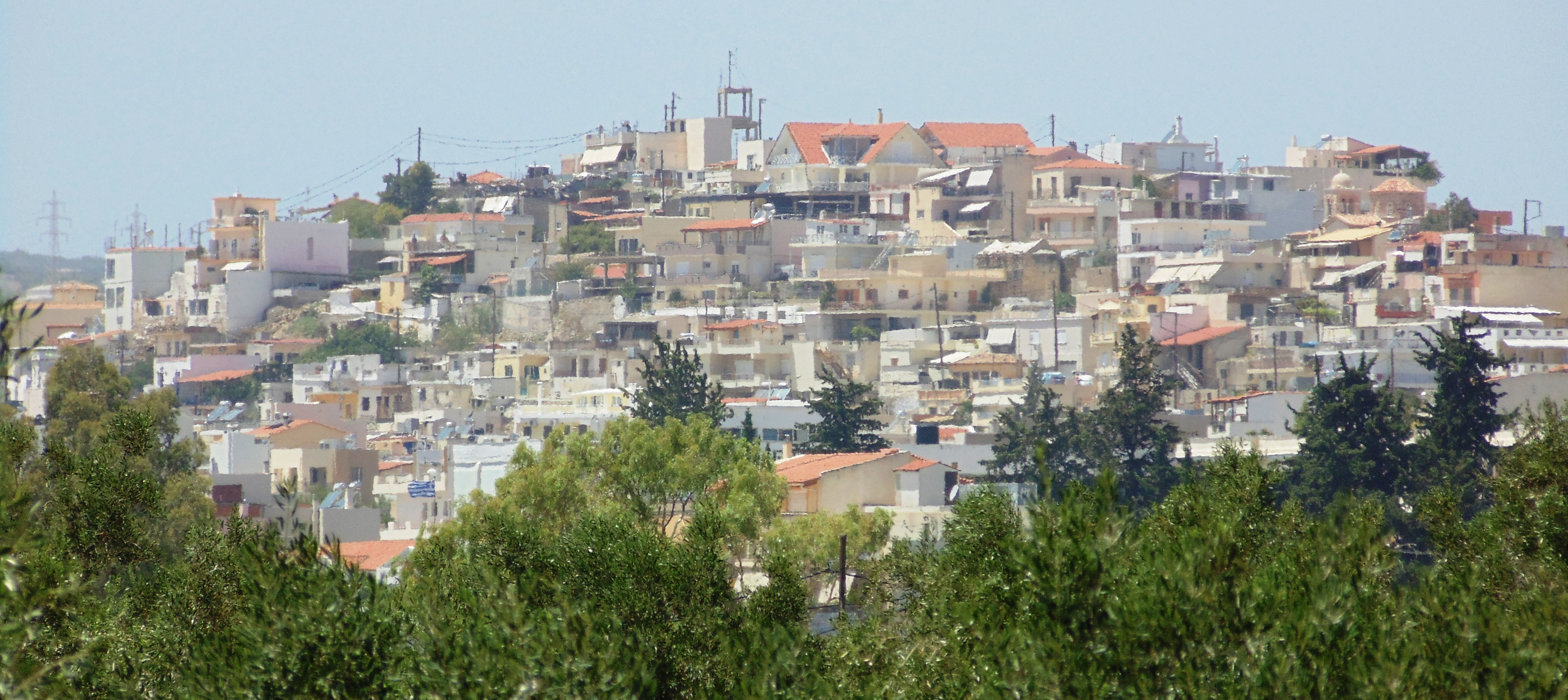

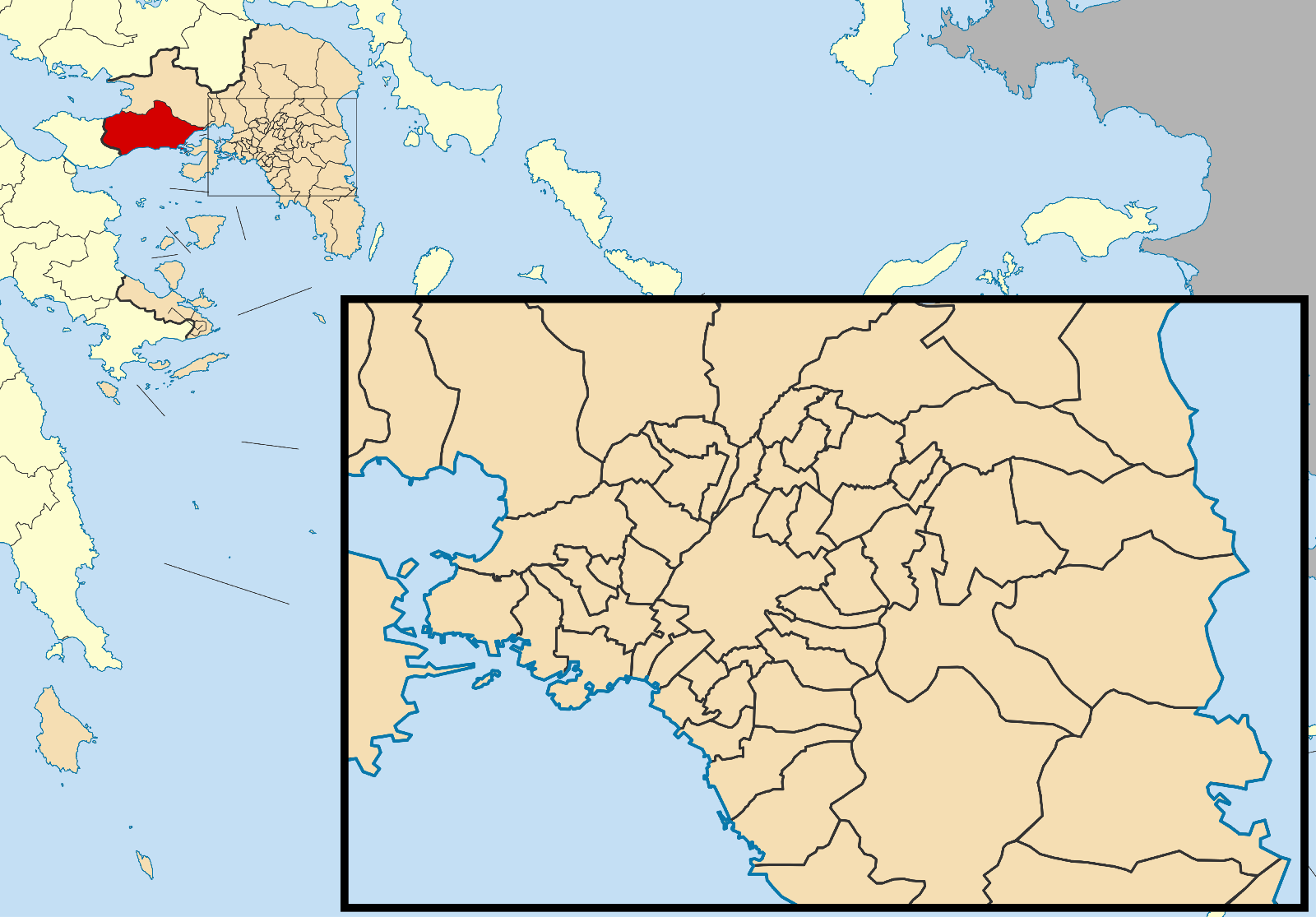

- Location within Greece
- Coordinates: 37°59′47″N 23°20′40″E
- Country: Greece
- Administrative region: Attica
- Regional unit: West Attica

Government
  - Mayor: Panagiotis Margetis (since 2023)

Area
  - Municipality: 330.1 km^{2} (127.5 sq mi)
  - Municipal unit: 322.2 km^{2} (124.4 sq mi)
- Elevation: 4 m (13 ft)

Population (2021)
  - Municipality: 38,033
  - Density: 115.2/km^{2} (298.4/sq mi)
  - Municipal unit: 30,773
  - Municipal unit density: 95.51/km^{2} (247.4/sq mi)
  - Community: 29,122
- Time zone: UTC+2 (EET)
  - Summer (DST): UTC+3 (EEST)
- Postal code: 191 00
- Area code: 22960
- Website: www.megara.gr

Megara (/ˈmɛɡərə/; Greek: Μέγαρα, pronounced [ˈmeɣaɾa]) is a historic town and a municipality in West Attica, Greece. It lies in the northern section of the Isthmus of Corinth opposite the island of Salamis, which belonged to Megara in archaic times, before being taken by Athens. Megara was one of the four districts of Attica, embodied in the four mythic sons of King Pandion II, of whom Nisos was the ruler of Megara. Megara was also a trade port, its people using their ships and wealth as a way to gain leverage on armies of neighboring poleis. Megara specialized in the exportation of wool and other animal products including livestock such as horses. It possessed two harbors, Pagae to the west on the Corinthian Gulf, and Nisaea to the east on the Saronic Gulf of the Aegean Sea. Greek painter Théodore Jacques Ralli created countless paintings featuring the village of Megara between 1873 and 1909.

== History ==
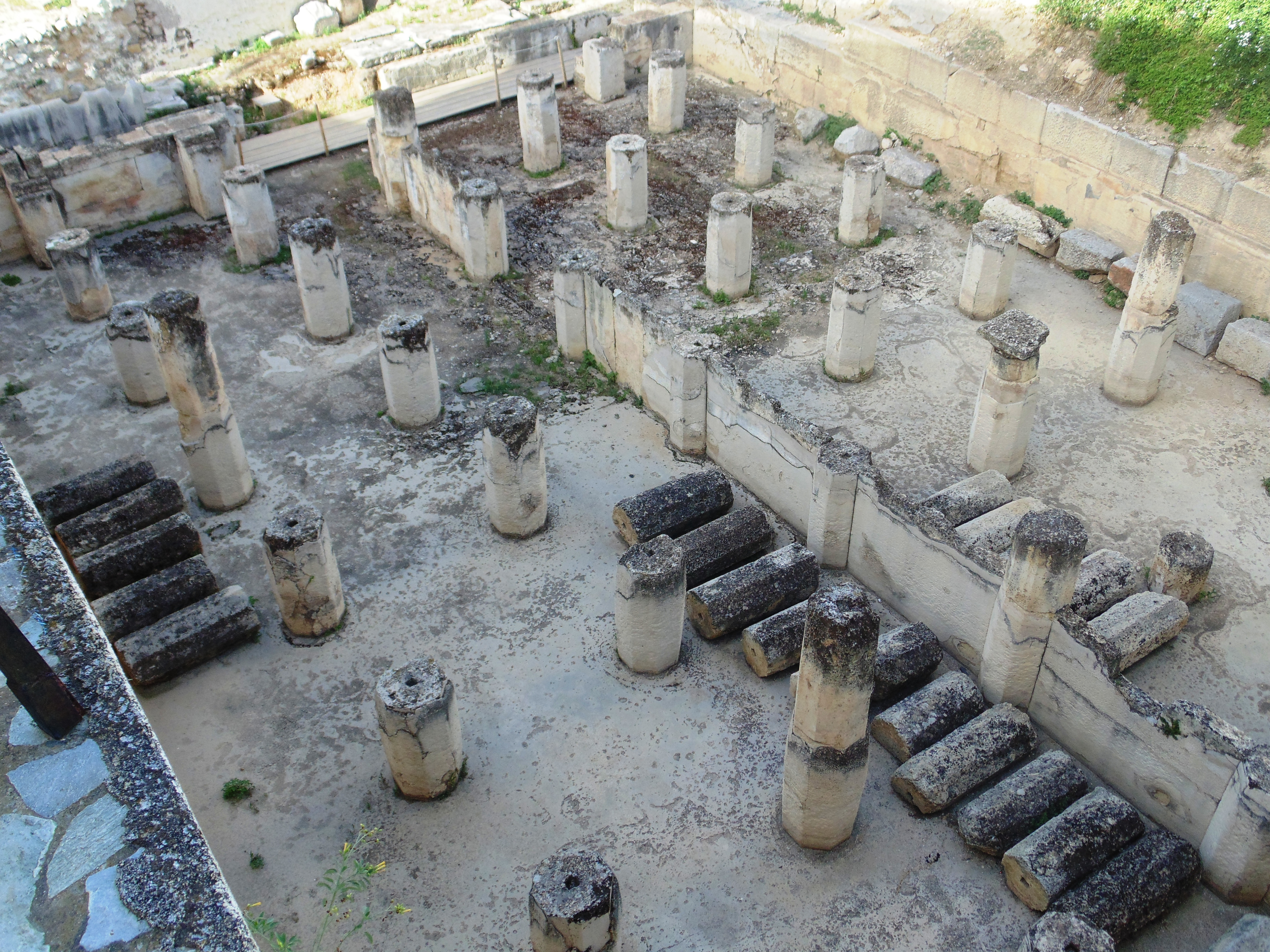
View of the archaeological site

=== Late Bronze ===
==== Mycenaean period ====
In the Late Bronze Age, Megara features prominently as a small kingdom in the myths and legends of Homer. Megara emerged between two fortified ports, Nisaea on the Saronic Gulf and Pagae on the Gulf of Corinth, on two acropolises Karia and Alkathos. However, Megara at this point remains more mythical until it started expanding in Iron II.

In Greek mythology, Nisus was a King of Megara and son of king Pandion II of Athens, and gave his name to the port Nisaea. Pandion II had married Pylia, daughter of King Pylas of Megara. Pylas was the son of Cteson, son of Lelex. Megara was the capital in Megaris.

==== Archaeology ====
Megara is considered a Mycenaean fortified site. Myths suggests the seat of a petty king with a megaron. However, modern buildings obscure the remains and only some ruins have been found. Isolated blocks of Cyclopean walls were first found on the upper part of the hill by Fimmen and later by Field. A palace here would command the costal plain and valley towards the north-east.

=== Iron Age ===
According to Pausanias, the Megarians said that their town owed its origin to Car, the son of Phoroneus, who built the citadel called 'Caria' and the temples of Demeter called Megara, from which the place derived its name.

In historical times, Megara was an early dependency of Corinth, in which capacity colonists from Megara founded Megara Hyblaea, a small polis north of Syracuse in Sicily. Megara then fought a war of independence with Corinth, and afterwards founded Chalcedon in 685 BC, as well as Byzantium (c. 667 BC).

Megara is known to have early ties with Miletos, which is located within the region of Caria in Asia Minor. According to some scholars, they had built up a "colonisation alliance". In the 7th/6th century BCE these two cities acted in concordance with each other.

Both cities acted under the leadership and sanction of an Apollo oracle. Megara cooperated with that of Delphi. Miletos had her own oracle of Apollo Didymeus Milesios in Didyma. Also, there are many parallels in the political organisation of both cities.

In the late 7th century BC Theagenes established himself as tyrant of Megara by slaughtering the cattle of the rich to win over the poor. Arguably the most famous citizen of Megara in antiquity was Byzas, the legendary founder of Byzantium in the 7th century BC. The 6th century BC poet Theognis also came from Megara.

==== Second Persian Invasion ====
During the second Persian invasion of Greece (480–479 BC) Megara fought alongside the Spartans and Athenians at crucial battles such as Salamis and Plataea.

==== First Peloponnesian War ====
Megara defected from the Spartan-dominated Peloponnesian League (c. 460 BC) to the Delian league due to border disputes with its neighbour Corinth; this defection was one of the causes of the First Peloponnesian War (460 – c. 445 BC). By the terms of the Thirty Years' Peace of 446–445 BC Megara was forced to return to the Peloponnesian League.

==== Second Peloponnesian War ====
In the (second) Peloponnesian War (c. 431 – 404 BC), Megara was an ally of Sparta. The Megarian decree is considered to be one of several contributing "causes" of the Peloponnesian War. Athens issued the Megarian decree, which banned Megarian merchants from territory controlled by Athens; its aim was to constrict the Megarian economy. The Athenians claimed that they were responding to the Megarians' desecration of the Hiera Orgas, a sacred precinct in the border region between the two states.

In the 5th century BC, Herodicus, the father of sports medicine, recommended patients walk from Athens to Megara. This is the first time in history where patients were prescribed exercise.

In the early 4th century BC, Euclid of Megara founded the Megarian school of philosophy which flourished for about a century, famous for the use of logic and dialectic.

=== Democracy in Megara ===
Megara seems to have experienced democracy on two occasions. The first was between 427 BC, when there was a democratic uprising, and 424 BC, when a narrow oligarchy was installed (Thuc. 3.68.3; 4.66-8, 73–4). The second was in the 370s BC, when we hear that the people of Megara expelled some anti-democratic conspirators (Diod. 15.40.4). By the 350s BC, though, Isocrates is referring to Megara in terms that suggests that it was an oligarchy again (Isoc. 8.117-19).

One of the first actions of the new oligarchy in 424 BC was to compel the people to vote openly, which suggests that the democracy had made use of the secret ballot. Megarian democracy also made use of ostracism. Other key institutions of the democracy included a popular Assembly and Council, and a board of five (or six) generals.

According to Plutarch, Megara was also a democracy in the 6th century BC. The measures said to be implemented by the radical government included making interest-bearing loans illegal and forcing creditors to return the interest they had collected. While some historians accept the existence of democracy in the archaic period, others consider the story to reflect the later anti-democratic political thought.

=== Hellenistic Age ===
During the Celtic invasion in 279 BC, Megara sent a force of 400 peltasts (light infantrymen) to Thermopylae. During the Chremonidean War, in 266 BC, the Megarians were besieged by the Macedonian king Antigonus Gonatas and managed to defeat his elephants employing burning pigs. Despite this success, the Megarians had to submit to the Macedonians.

In 243 BC, exhorted by Aratus of Sicyon, Megara expelled its Macedonian garrison and joined the Achaean League, but when the Achaeans lost control of the Isthmus in 223 BC the Megarians left them and joined the Boeotian League. Not more than thirty years later, however, the Megarians grew tired of the Boeotian decline and returned their allegiance to Achaea. The Achaean strategos Philopoemen fought off the Boeotian intervention force and secured Megara's return, either in 203 or in 193 BC.

According to Plutarch, Megarians tried to unleash lions against the besieging Roman troops guided by Quintus Fufius Calenus around 48 BC, but the animals "rushed among the unarmed citizens themselves and preyed upon them as they ran hither and thither, so that even to the enemy the sight was a pitiful one".

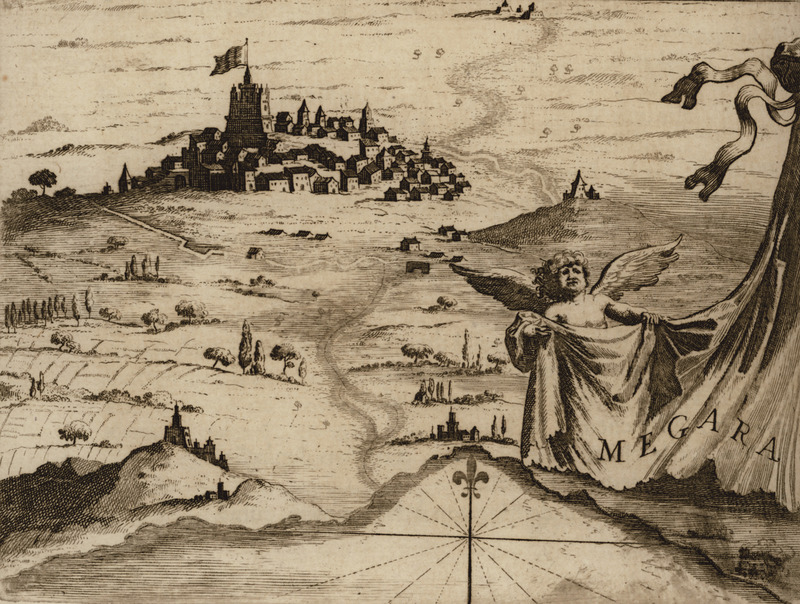
Megara by Vincenzo Coronelli, 1687

The Megarians were proverbial for their generosity in building and endowing temples. Saint Jerome reports "There is a common saying about the Megarians [...:] 'They build as if they are to live forever; they live as if they are to die tomorrow.'"

The Greeks used the proverb "worthy of the Megarians share" (Ancient Greek: Τῆς Μεγαρέων ἄξιοι μερίδος), meaning dishonorable/dishonored.

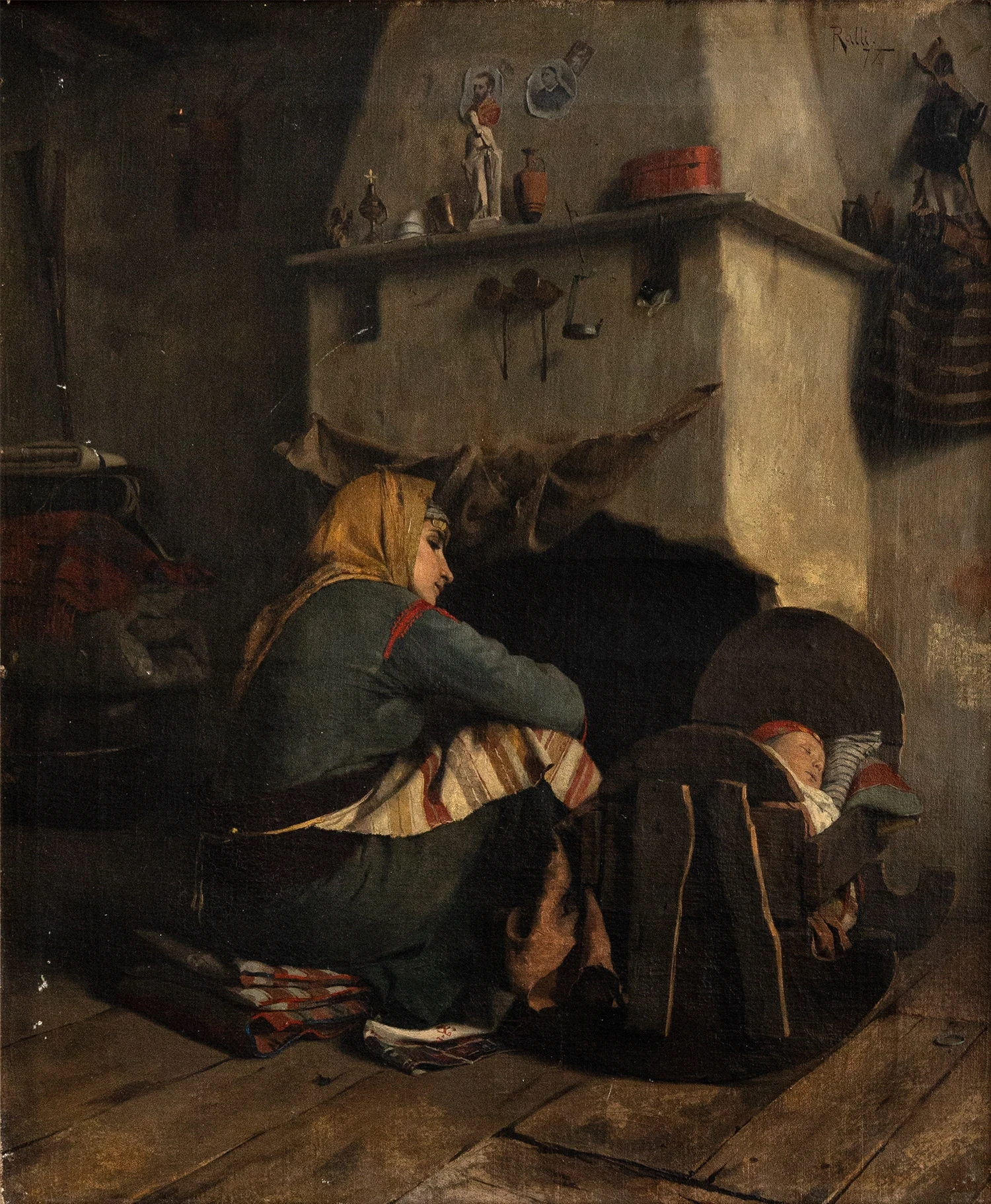
Young Mother from Megara by Théodore Jacques Ralli c. 1878

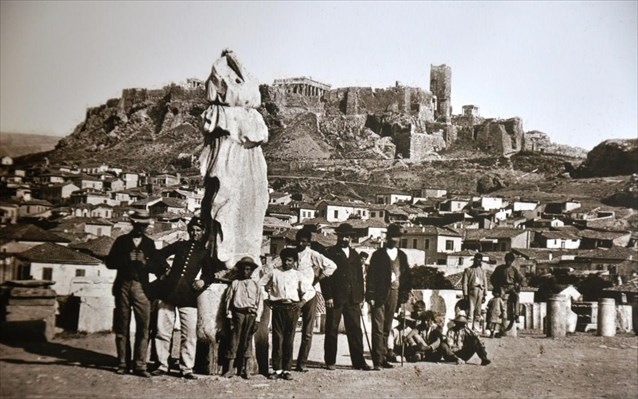
The Nike of Megara, large statue of the goddess Nike found at Megara in 1820.

== Geography ==
Megara is located in the westernmost part of Attica, near the Megara Gulf, a bay of the Saronic Gulf. The coastal plain around Megara is referred to as Megaris, which is also the name of the ancient city state centered on Megara. Megara is 8 km west of Nea Peramos, 18 km west of Elefsina, 19 km east of Agioi Theodoroi, 34 km west of Athens and 37 km east of Corinth.

== Transport ==
=== Road ===
The A8 motorway connects Megara with Athens and Corinth.

=== Rail ===
The Megara railway station is served by Proastiakos suburban trains to Athens and Kiato.

=== Air ===
There is a small military airfield south of the town, ICAO code LGMG.

== Municipality ==
Municipality map

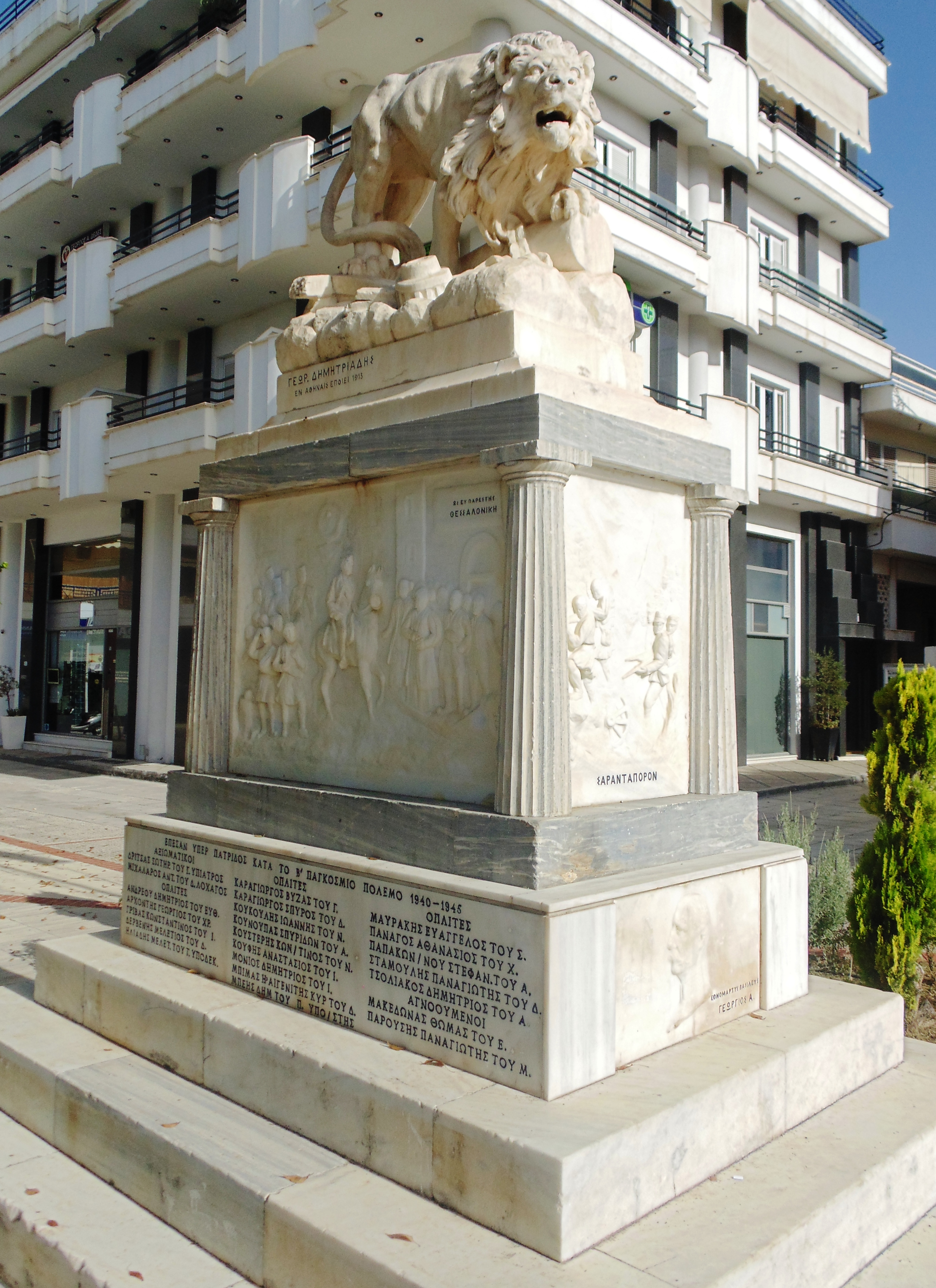
Monument at Heroes' Square

The municipality of Megara was formed at the 2011 local government reform by the merger of two former municipalities, Megara and Nea Peramos, which became municipal units. In 2017 Kineta became a separate community within the municipal unit of Megara.

The municipality has an area of 330.11 km^{2}, the municipal unit 322.21 km^{2}.

== Districts and suburbs ==
- Agia Triada
- Aigeirouses
- Kineta
- Koumintri
- Lakka Kalogirou
- Moni Agiou Ierotheou
- Moni Agiou Ioannou Prodromou
- Moni Panachrantou
- Pachi
- Stikas
- Vlychada

== Population ==
| Year | Town | Municipal unit | Municipality |
|---|---|---|---|
| 1971 | 17,584 | – | – |
| 1981 | 20,814 | 21,245 | – |
| 1991 | 20,403 | 25,061 | – |
| 2001 | 23,032 | 28,195 | – |
| 2011 | 23,456 | 28,591 | 36,924 |
| 2021 | 25,467 | 30,773 | 38,033 |

== Sports ==
- Vyzas F.C., football team

== Notable people ==
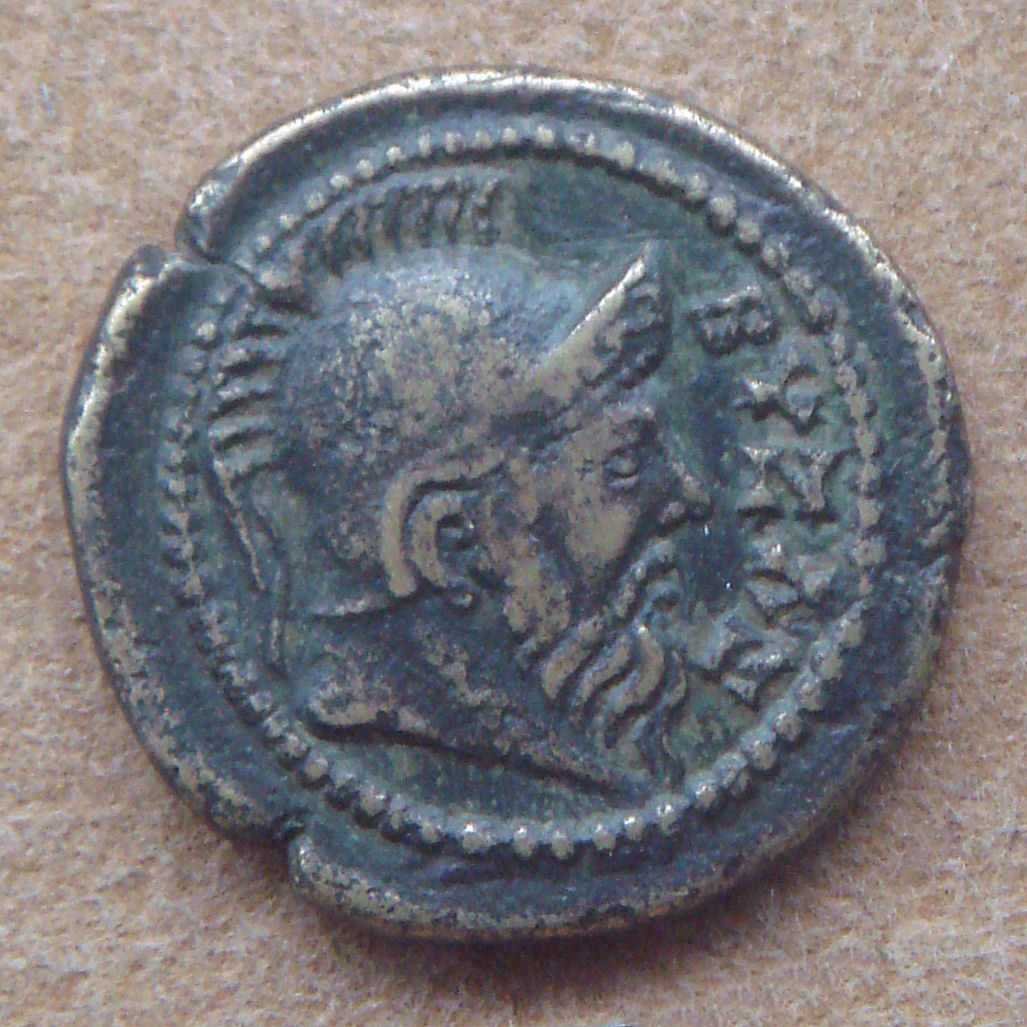
Coinage with idealized depiction of Byzas, founder of Byzantium. Struck in Byzantium, Thrace, around the time of Marcus Aurelius (161–180 CE).

- Orsippus (8th century BC), runner
- Byzas (7th century BC), founder of Byzantium
- Theognis (6th century BC), elegiac poet
- Eupalinos (6th century BC), engineer who built the Tunnel of Eupalinos on Samos
- Theagenes (c. 600 BC), Tyrant of Megara
- Euclid (c. 400 BC), founder of the Megarian school of philosophy
- Stilpo (c. 325 BC), philosopher of the Megarian school
- Praxion of Megara (4th century BC), an ancient Greek writer who wrote books on the history of Megara.
- Teles (3rd century BC), cynic philosopher.
- Georgios Papagiannis, Professional basketball player, playing for AS Monaco of the French top-tier LNB Élite

== Facilities ==
- Medium-wave transmitter with a 180-metre-tall radio mast, broadcasting on 666 kHz and 981 kHz

== Popular culture ==
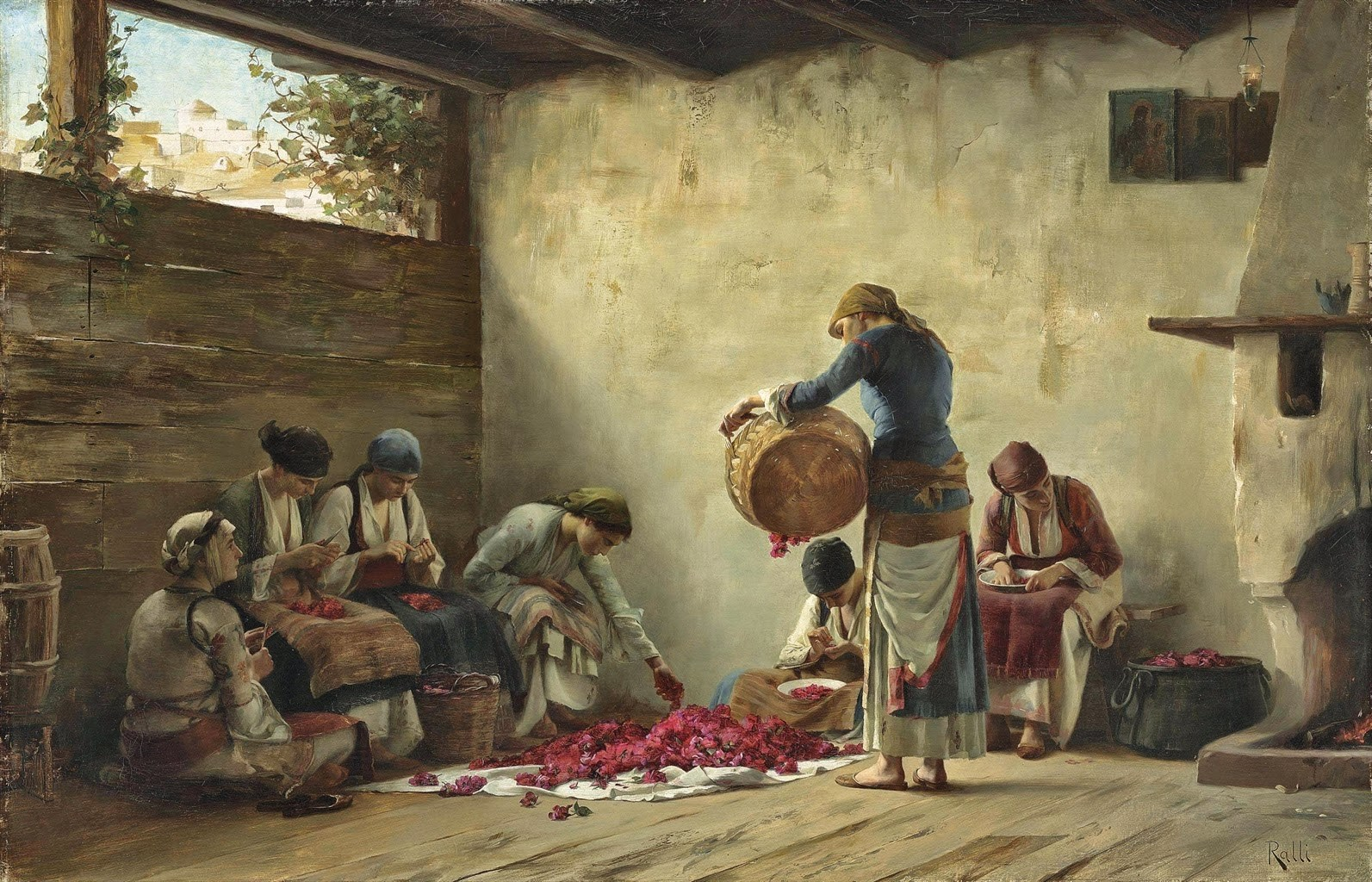
Les Confitures de Roses à Mégara by Théodore Jacques Ralli c. 1892 Greek women are making rose petal jam in the Greek village of Megara.

Greek painter Théodore Jacques Ralli created countless paintings featuring the village of Megara between 1873 and 1909. The artist chose to paint local subjects featuring everyday life in the village. Some of his works featuring Megara include Les Confitures de Roses a Megara, Praying Before the Communion at Megara, and Woman from Megara with Sickle. In 1974, a Greek documentary named Megara was made about the village, directed by Sakis Maniatis and Yorgos Tsemberopoulos, about the struggle of olive growers in Megara fighting the Greek Military Junta's attempt to take a large agricultural region of the village and use it to build an oil refinery. The name Megara is used in the 1997 Disney film Hercules. In 2024, parts of the film called The Carpenter's Son directed by Lotfy Nathan and starring Nicolas Cage were filmed in Megara.

== See also ==
- List of ancient Greek cities
- List of settlements in Attica
