= Chione =

Chione, or Khione (Χιόνη, from the Greek χιών chiōn, "snow") may refer to:

== In Greek mythology ==
- Chione (mythology), the name of several figures in Greek mythology, including:
  - Chione (daughter of Boreas), mother of Eumolpus by Poseidon
  - Chione (daughter of Callirrhoe), who was changed into a snow cloud
  - Chione (daughter of Arcturus), who was abducted by Boreas and bore him three sons
  - Chione (daughter of Daedalion), who bore both Hermes and Apollo sons

== In biology ==
- Chione (plant), a plant genus in the family Rubiaceae
- Chione (bivalve), a mollusc genus of bivalves in the family Veneridae

== In astronomy ==
- 6261 Chione (1976 WC) is a Mars-crossing asteroid discovered on November 30, 1976 by Schuster, H.-E. at La Silla.

== In popular culture ==
- Khione, daughter of Boreas, a character in the book The Lost Hero and The House of Hades by Rick Riordan
- Khione (The Flash), a character in the 2014 U.S. TV series The Flash
