= Khioniya =

Khioniya, Khionija, Khionia, and Chionia are transliterations of the Russian female name Хиония. It may refer to:

- Khioniya Guseva (c. 1880/81 – after 1919), who attempted to kill Grigori Rasputin in 1914.
- Khioniya Talanova (1822–1880), Russian stage actress
- Chionia, reputed Christian martyred in AD 304 along with Agape and Irene
- Khionia Alekseyevna Zaplatina, in the 1972 film Privalov's Millions, a character played by Lyudmila Shagalova
- Saint Khionia Archangelsky, commemorated in October 4 (Eastern Orthodox liturgics)

== See also ==
- Khione (disambiguation)
- Fiona, sometimes used as an anglicised equivalent
