= Benthesikyme =

Daughter of Poseidon and Amphitrite

In Greek mythology, Benthesikyme or Benthesicyme (/bɛnθəˈsɪsɪmiː/; Ancient Greek: Βενθεσικύμη, romanized: Benthesikýmē) was, according to the mythographer Apollodorus, a daughter of Poseidon and Amphitrite, and the foster mother of Eumolpus. After Chione slept with Poseidon, she gave birth to Eumolpus, but, to avoid the detection of her father, she threw the infant into the sea. Poseidon rescued the child, and gave it to Benthesikyme to raise. Once Eumolpus had grown up, the husband of Benthesikyme gave to him one of their own two daughters; Eumolpus was later expelled for attempting to violate the other daughter.
