= Boreas =

Greek god of the north wind

- God of the north wind, storms, and winter
- Member of the Anemoi
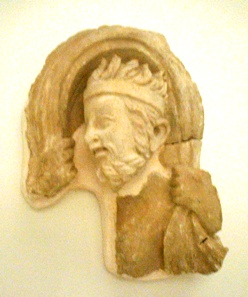
- Greco-Buddhist fragment of the god Boreas with billowing cloak (velificatio) overhead. Hadda, Afghanistan.
- Abode: Sky, Mount Olympus
- Symbol: Conch shell

Genealogy
- Parents: Astraeus and Eos
- Siblings: Winds (Eurus, Notus and Zephyrus), Eosphorus, the Stars, Memnon, Emathion, Astraea
- Consort: Oreithyia
- Children: Boreads, Chione, Cleopatra, Butes, Haemus, Upis, Cyparissia, twelve colts

Equivalents
- Roman: Aquilo

Boreas (/ˈbɔːri.əs/, UK: /ˈbɒri.əs/, UK: /ˈbɒri.æs/; Ancient Greek: Βορέας, romanized: Boréas; also Βορρᾶς, Borrhâs) is the Greek god of the cold north wind, storms, and winter. Although he was normally taken as the north wind, the Roman writers Aulus Gellius and Pliny the Elder both took Boreas as a northeast wind, equivalent to the Roman god Aquilo or Septentrio. Boreas is depicted as being very strong, with a violent temper to match. He was frequently shown as a winged old man or sometimes as a young man with shaggy hair and beard, holding a conch shell and wearing a billowing cloak. Boreas's most known myth is his abduction of the Athenian princess Oreithyia.

== Description ==
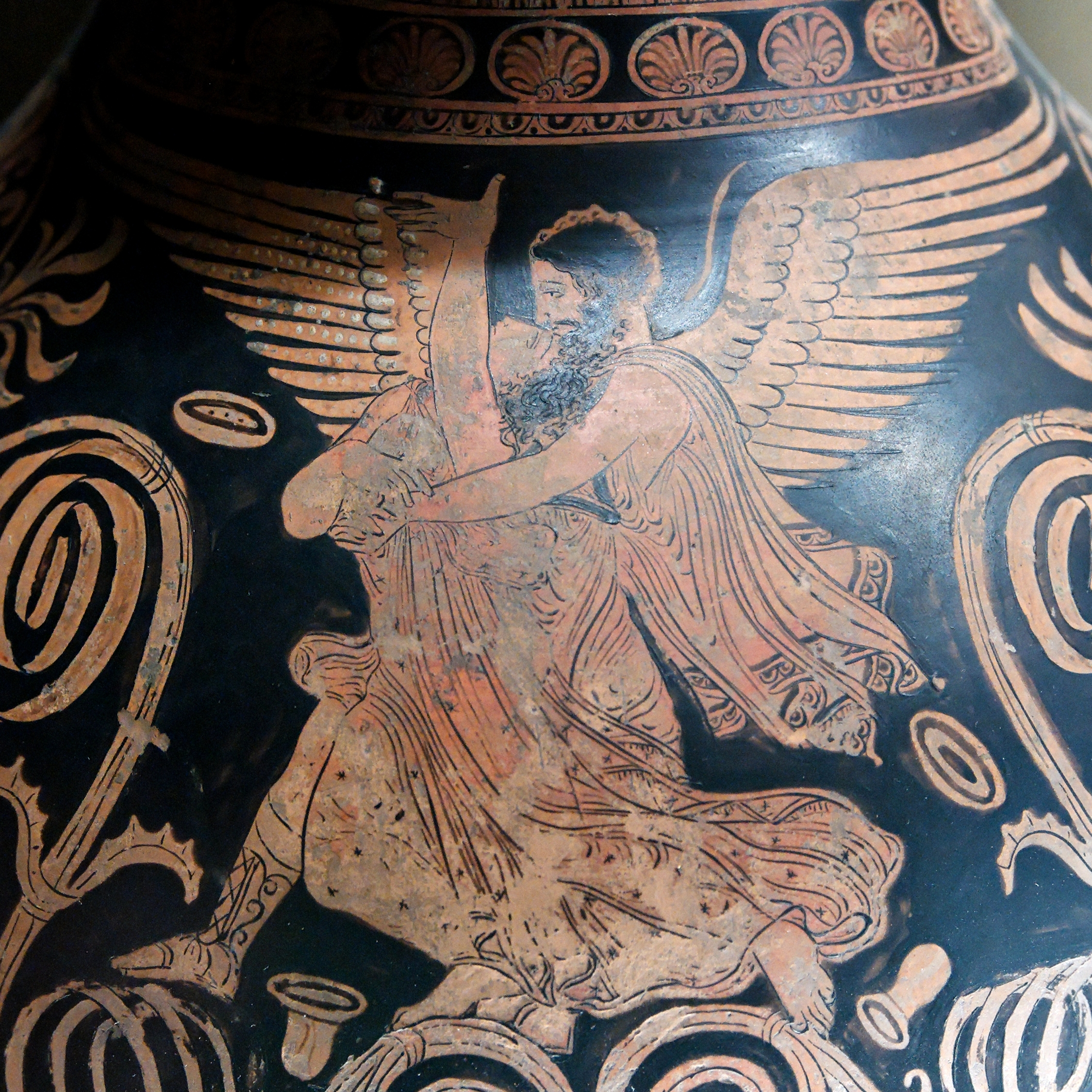
Boreas' rape of Oreithyia, Apulian red-figure oenochoe, 360 BC, Louvre.

Boreas, like the rest of the wind gods, was said to be the son of Eos, the goddess of the dawn, by her husband Astraeus, a minor star-god. He is thus brother to the rest of the Anemoi (the wind gods), the five star-gods and the justice goddess Astraea.

Boreas was closely associated with horses, storms, and winter. He was said to have fathered twelve colts, after taking the form of a stallion, to the mares of Erichthonius, king of Dardania. These were said to be able to run across a field of grain without trampling the plants. Pliny the Elder (Natural History iv.35 and viii.67) thought that mares might stand with their hindquarters to the North Wind and bear foals without a stallion. The Greeks believed that his home was in Thrace, and Herodotus and Pliny both describe a northern land known as Hyperborea "Beyond the North Wind" where people lived in complete happiness and had extraordinarily long lifespans.

He is said to have fathered three giant Hyperborean priests of Apollo by Chione. Pausanias wrote that Boreas had snakes instead of feet, though in art he was usually depicted with winged human feet. In ancient art, he is usually depicted as a bearded older man.

== Mythology ==
=== Oreithyia ===
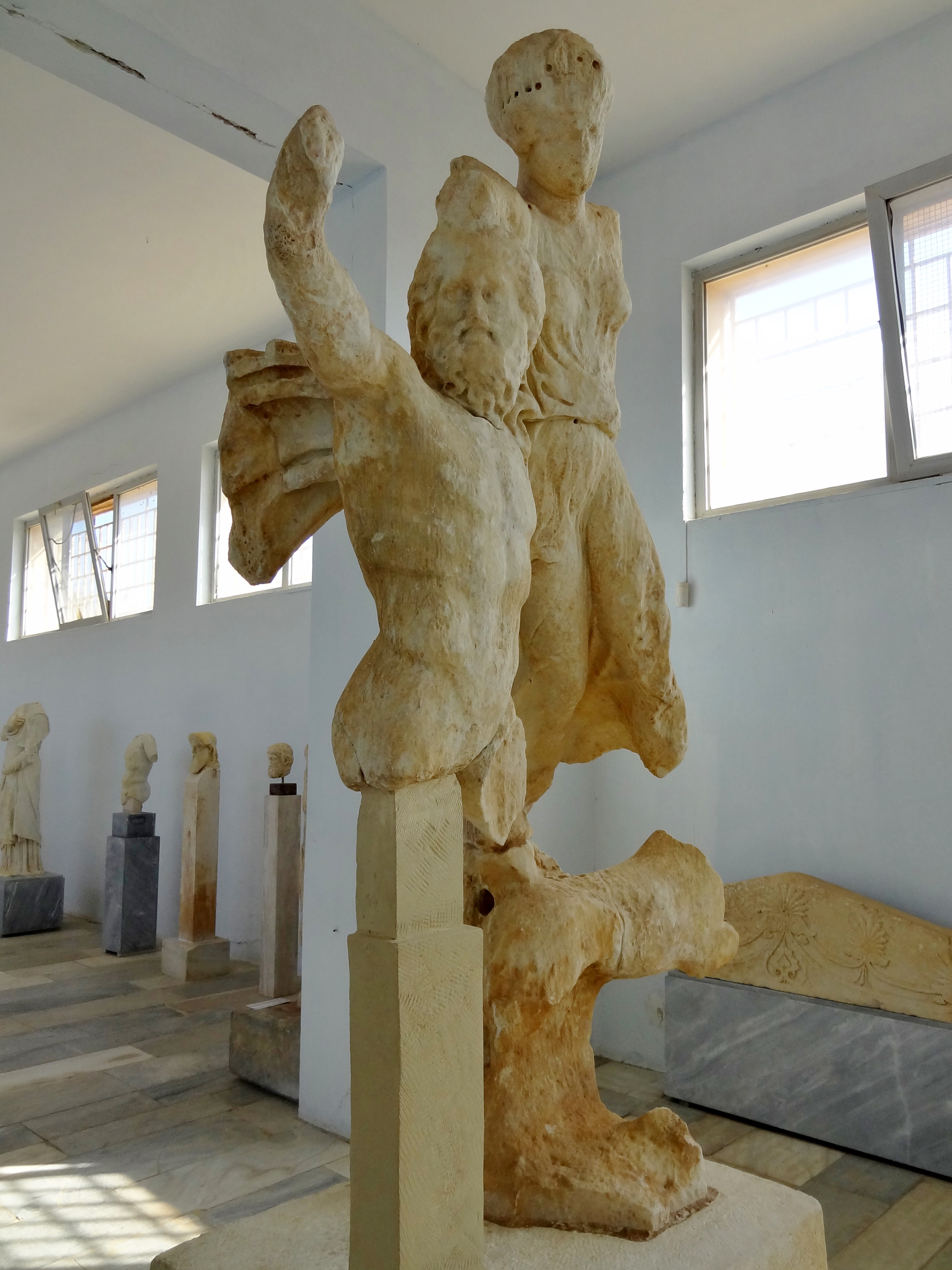
Boreas abducts Oreithyia, ca 500s BC, Archaeological Museum of Delos.

Boreas was said to have kidnapped Orithyia, an Athenian princess, from the Ilisos. Boreas had taken a fancy to Orithyia and had initially pleaded for her favours, hoping to persuade her. When this failed, he reverted to his usual temper and abducted her as she danced on the banks of the Ilisos. Boreas wrapped Orithyia up in a cloud, raped her, and with her, Boreas fathered two sons—the Boreads, Zethes and Calais, who were part of the crew of the Argo as Argonauts—and two daughters—Chione and Cleopatra.

From then on, the Athenians saw Boreas as a relative by marriage. When Athens was threatened by Xerxes, the people prayed to Boreas, who was said to have then caused winds to sink 400 Persian ships. A cult was established in Athens in 480 B. C. E. in gratitude to the Boreas for destroying the approaching Persian fleet. A similar event had occurred twelve years earlier, and Herodotus writes:

Now I cannot say if this was really why the Persians were caught at anchor by the stormwind, but the Athenians are quite positive that, just as Boreas helped them before, so Boreas was responsible for what happened on this occasion also. And when they went home they built the god a shrine by the River Ilissus.

Two other cases of Boreas being honored by Greek states for similar assistance have been described, in Megalopolis (against Laconia) and in Thurii (against Syracuse). The latter case had Boreas being granted citizenship and a land plot.

The abduction of Orithyia was popular in Athens before and after the Persian War, and was frequently depicted on vase paintings. In these paintings, Boreas was portrayed as a bearded man in a tunic, with shaggy hair that is sometimes frosted and spiked. The abduction was also dramatized in Aeschylus's lost play Oreithyia.

=== Other love affairs ===
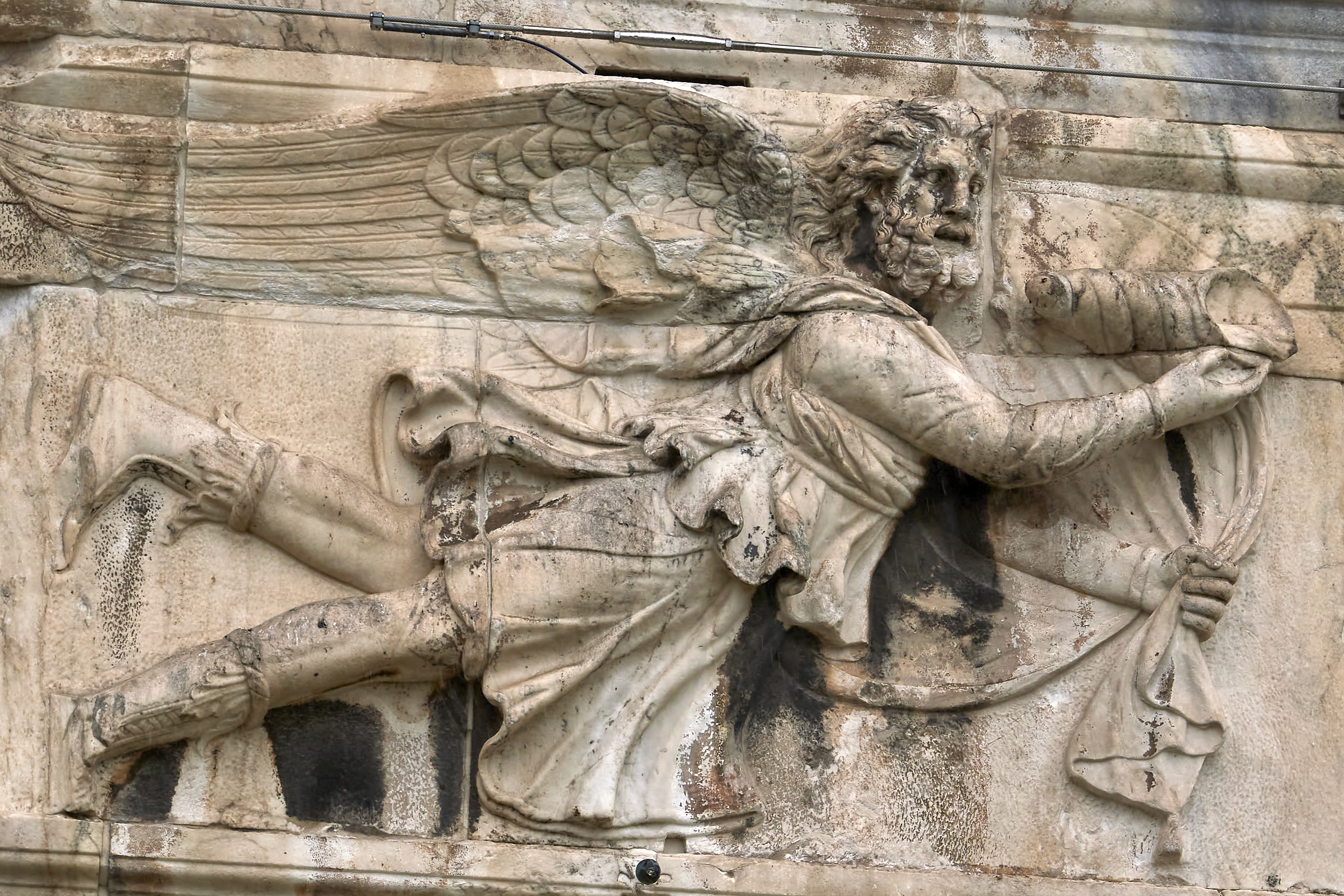
Relief of Boreas in the Tower of the Winds, Athens.

In some versions of Hyacinthus's story, Boreas supplants his brother Zephyrus as the wind-god that bore a one-sided love for the beautiful Spartan prince, who preferred Apollo over him.

In other accounts, Boreas was the father of Butes (by another woman) and the lover of the nymph Pitys. In one story, both Pan and Boreas vied for Pitys's affections, and tried to make her choose between them. To impress her, Boreas uprooted all the trees with his might. Pan only laughed, and Pitys chose him instead of Boreas. Angry, Boreas chased Pitys down and threw her off a cliff, killing her. Gaia, pitying the girl, changed her dead body into a pine tree.

During the journey of the Argo, Argonauts Zetes and Calais, Boreas's sons, describe Apollo as "beloved of our sire", perhaps implying a romantic connection between the two gods.

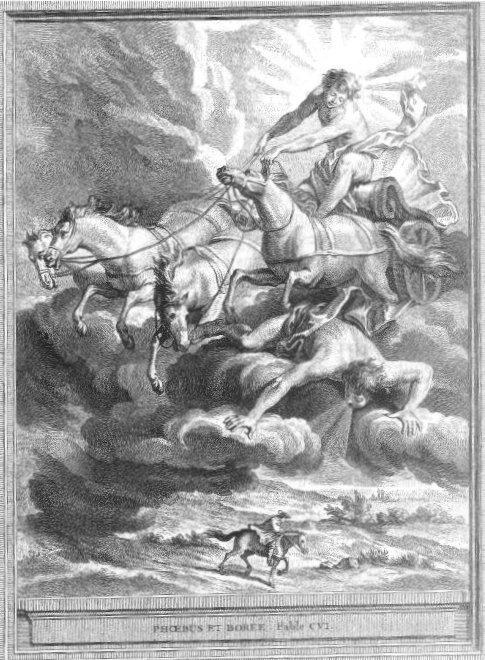
Phoebus and Boreas, Jean-Baptiste Oudry's cosmic interpretation of La Fontaine's fable, 1729/34

King Erichthonius of Troy had in his possession three thousand mares. Boreas fell in love with them as they pastured in the grasslands, and took the form of a dark-maned stallion in order to mate with them. Thus he fathered twelve colts on these mares. In the words of William Smith, this was "commonly explained as a mere figurative mode of expressing the extraordinary swiftness of those horses."

=== Other traditions ===
Boreas is featured in the oldest tale concerning the creation of the cypress tree; the myth goes that in order to honour his dead daughter Cyparissia, Boreas planted a new tree, the cypress. The inclusion of Boreas in the story continues the pattern of a wind god appearing in the story of a plant (like he does in the story of Pitys, or Zephyrus in the stories of Cyparissus and Hyacinthus).

When the goddess Leto, pregnant with Artemis and Apollo, was due, Boreas was ordered by Zeus to bring her to Poseidon, who in turn led her to the island of Ogygia where she could give birth to the twins, as Zeus' wife Hera had ordered all places and land to shun Leto.

In an Aesop fable, Boreas and his uncle Helios the sun god argued about which one between them was the strongest god. They agreed that whoever was able to make a passing traveller remove his cloak would be declared the winner. Boreas was the one to try his luck first; but no matter how hard he blew, he could not remove the man's cloak, instead making him wrap his cloak around him even tighter. Helios shone bright then, and the traveller, overcome with the heat, removed his cloak, giving him the victory (the moral being that persuasion is better than force).

According to Pausanias, Boreas blessed Musaeus with the gift of flight.

When Sirius, the dog star, began to burn hot after he could not have his beloved Opora, a minor goddess connected to the harvest, Boreas dealt with the intense heat by ordering his sons to deliver Opora to Sirius, while he cooled the earth down with blast of cold wind.

== Aquilo (Septentrio) ==
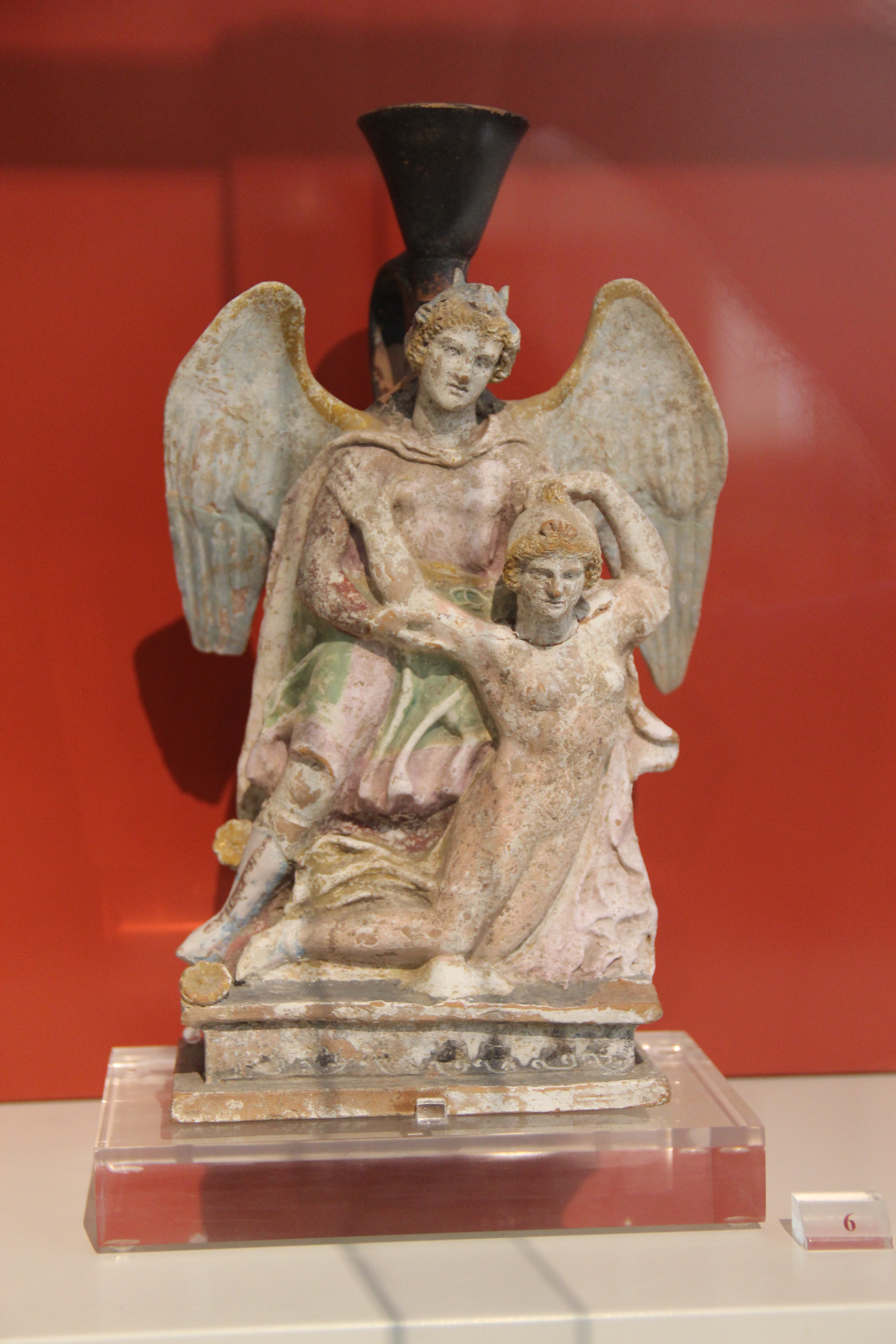
Terracotta lekythos with Boreas abducting Orithyia, 400–375 AD NAMA Greece.

The Roman equivalent of Boreas was Aquilo. This north (and slightly east) wind was associated with winter. The poet Virgil writes:

Interea magnum sol circumvolvitur annum,
et glacialis hiemps aquilonibus asperat undas.

Translation:

Now had the sun rolled through the year's full circle,
and the waves were rough with icy winter's northern gales

For the wind which came directly from the north the Romans sometimes used the name Septentrio, which refers to the seven (septem) stars of the Plow or Big Dipper constellation. The name "Septentrio" gave rise to the pre-modern compass point Septentrionalis.

== Outside Greco-Roman culture ==
Greek deities were abundantly used in Greco-Buddhist art, so too Boreas and its velificatio depiction element. Boreas became the Japanese wind god Fujin through the Greco-Buddhist Wardo/Oado and Chinese Feng Bo/Feng Po ("Uncle Wind"; among various other names).

== Genealogy ==
Boreas's family tree

Uranus	Gaia	Pontus
Oceanus	Tethys	Hyperion	Theia	Crius	Eurybia
The Rivers	The Oceanids	Helios	Selene	Eos'	Astraeus	Pallas	Perses
BOREAS; Anemoi	Astraea	Stars
Cronus	Rhea	Coeus	Phoebe
Hestia	Hera	Hades	Zeus	Leto	Asteria
Demeter	Poseidon
Iapetus	Clymene (or Asia)	Mnemosyne	(Zeus)	Themis
Atlas	Menoetius	Prometheus	Epimetheus	The Muses	The Horae

== Gallery ==
Boreas in Art

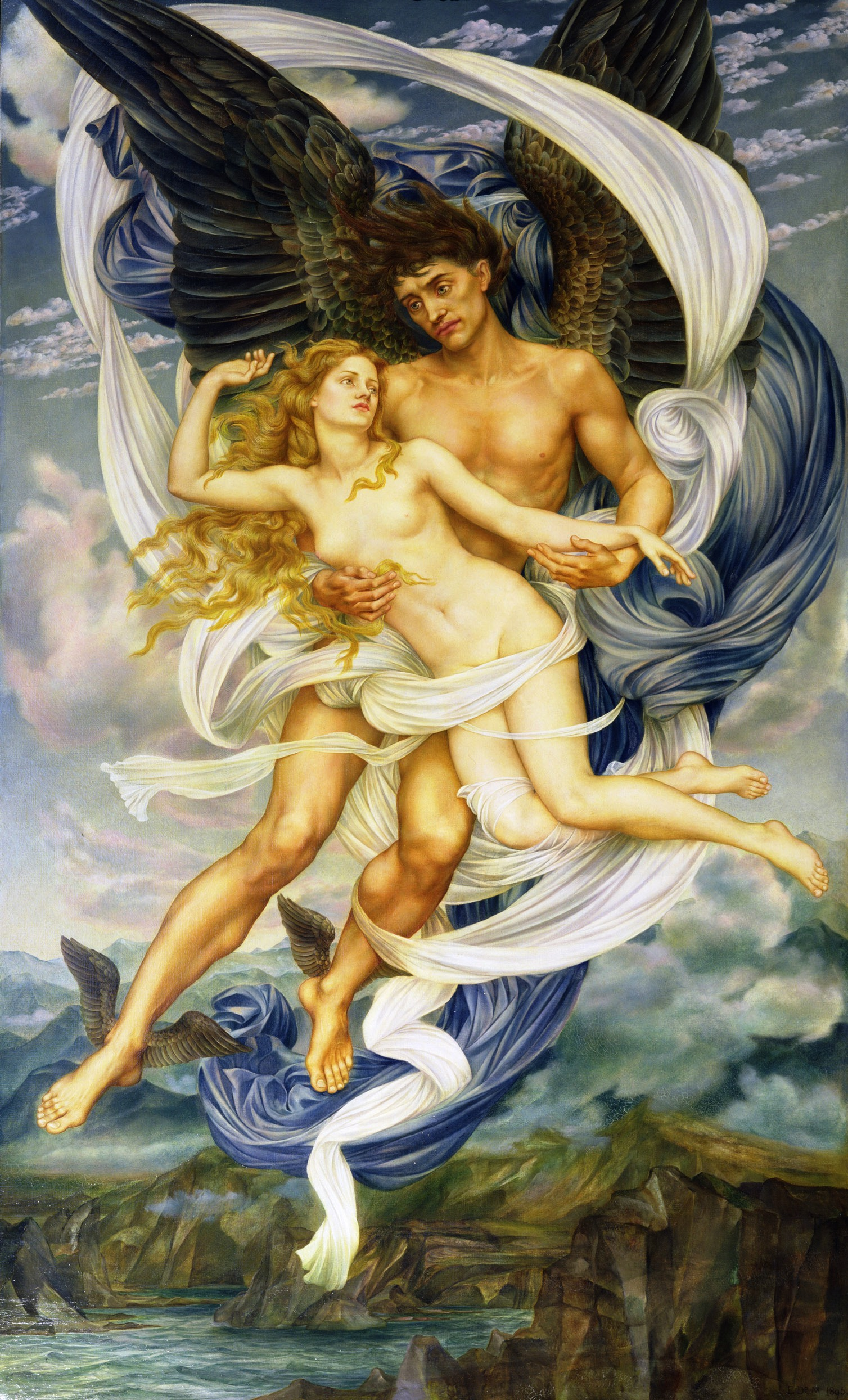
Boreas and Oreithyia, oil o canvas, ca 1896 Evelyn De Morgan.

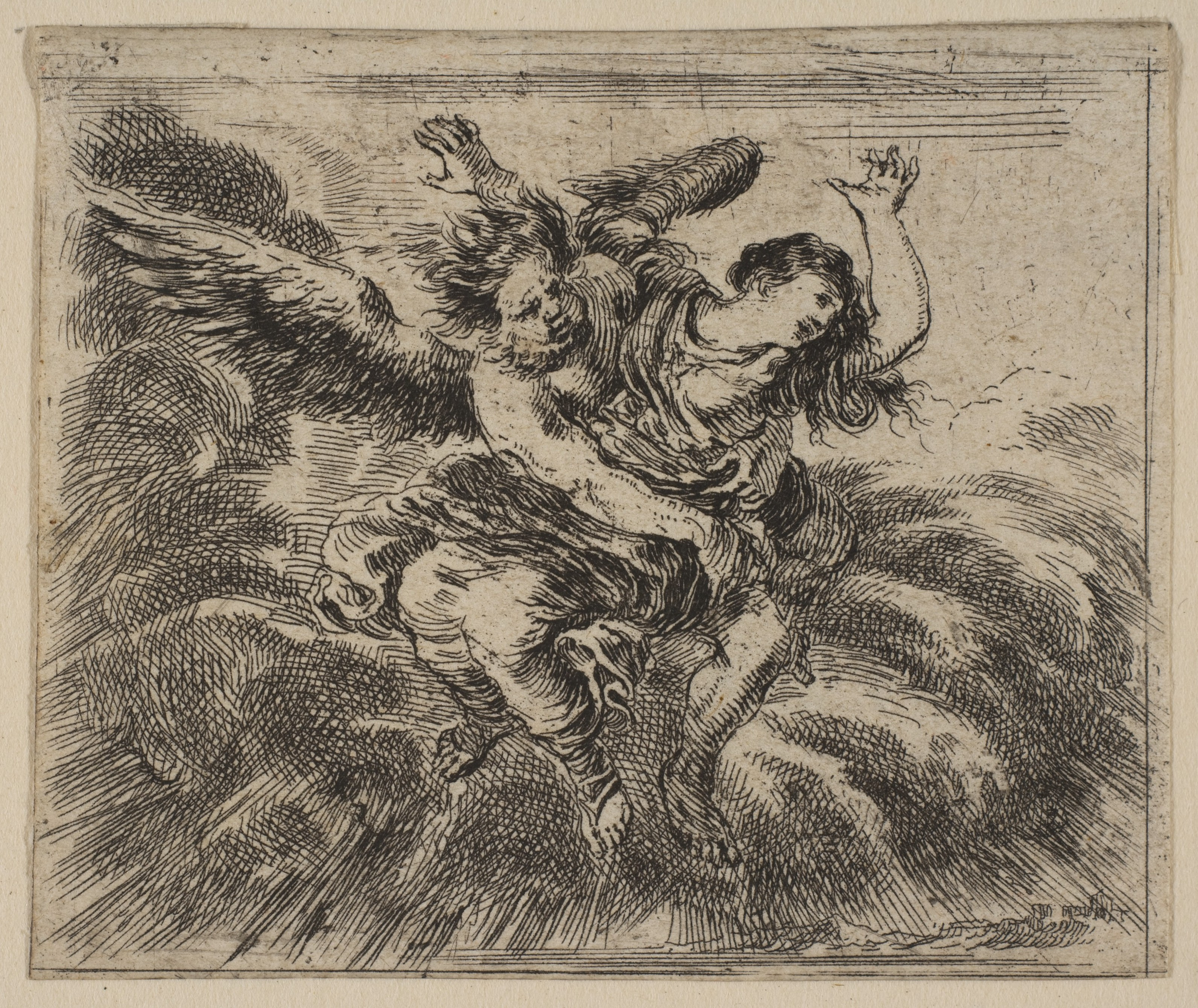
Boreas abducts Oreithyia, engraving by Stefano della Bella.

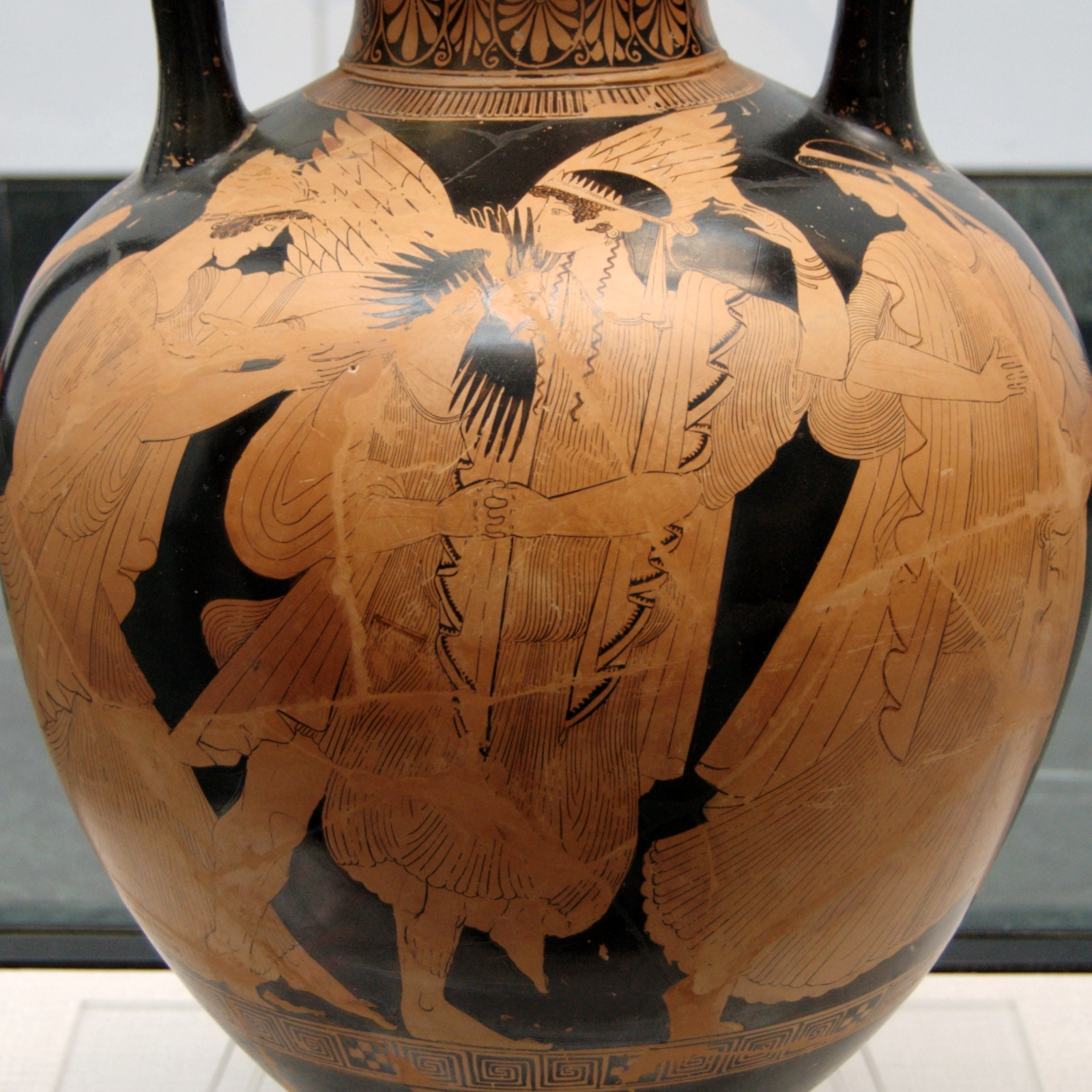
Boreas takes Oreithyia as Herse tries to help her sister, Attic red-figure pointed amphora, 470–460 BC.

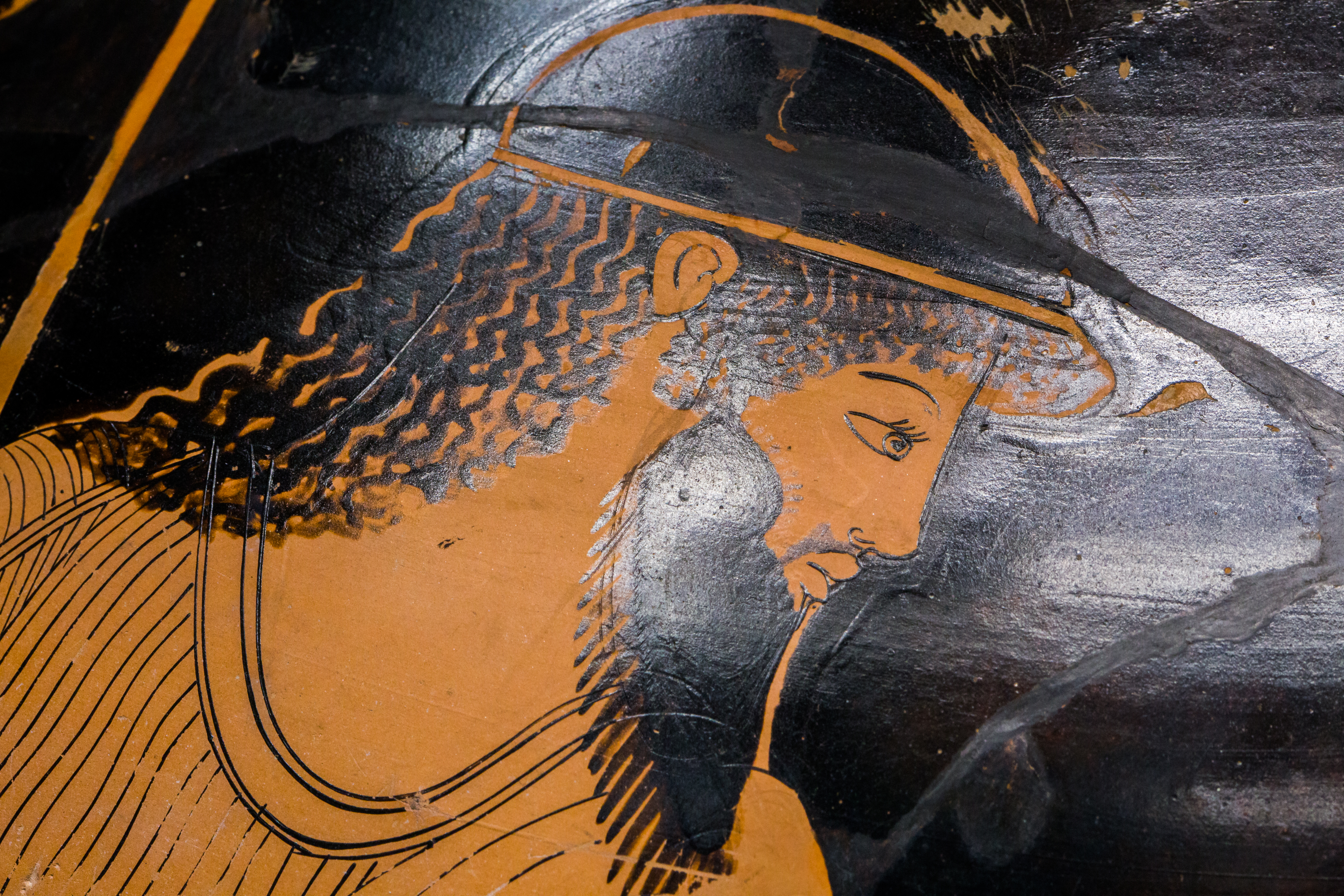
Boreas detail from an Attic red figure pointed amphora.

Boreas and fallen leaves, Evelyn de Morgan.

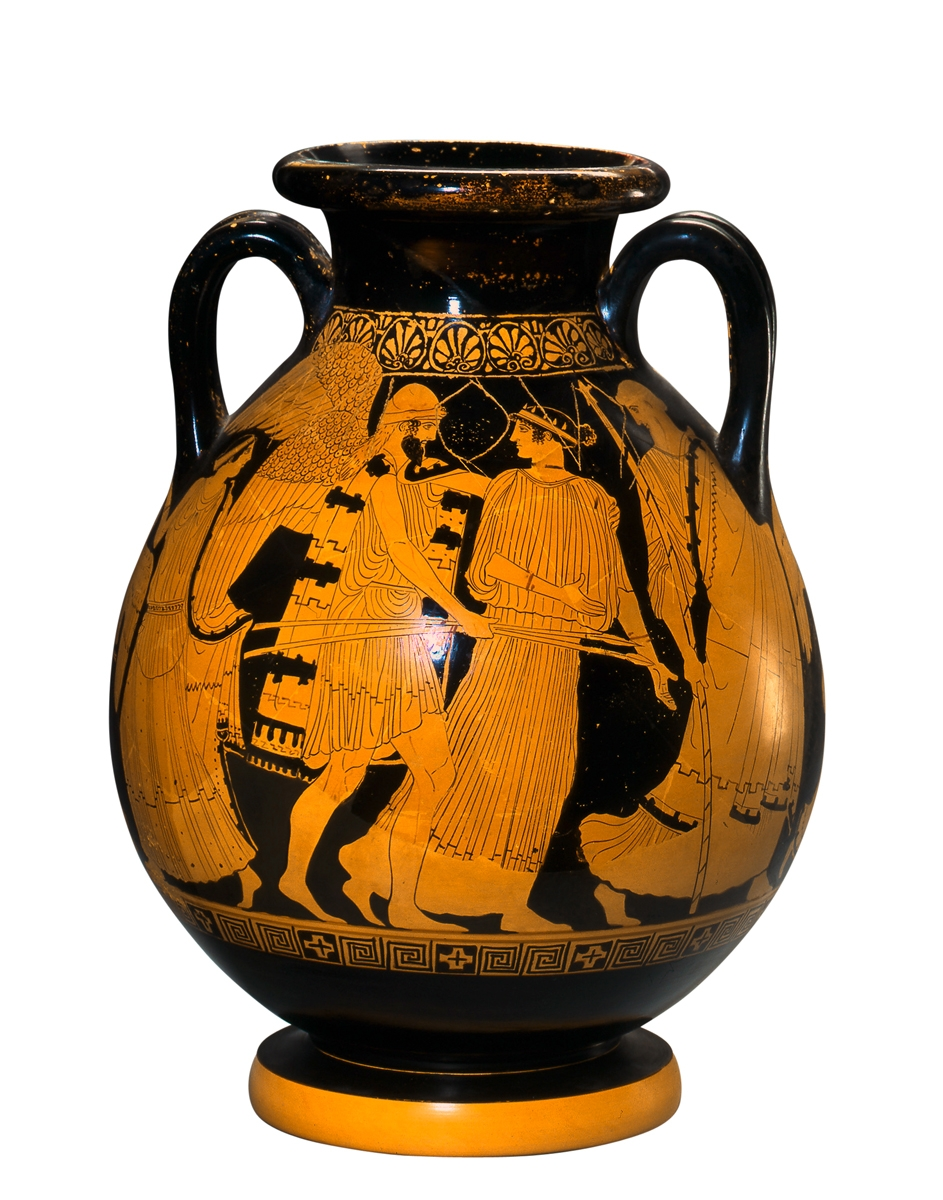
Boreas and Oreithyia, Attic red-figure.

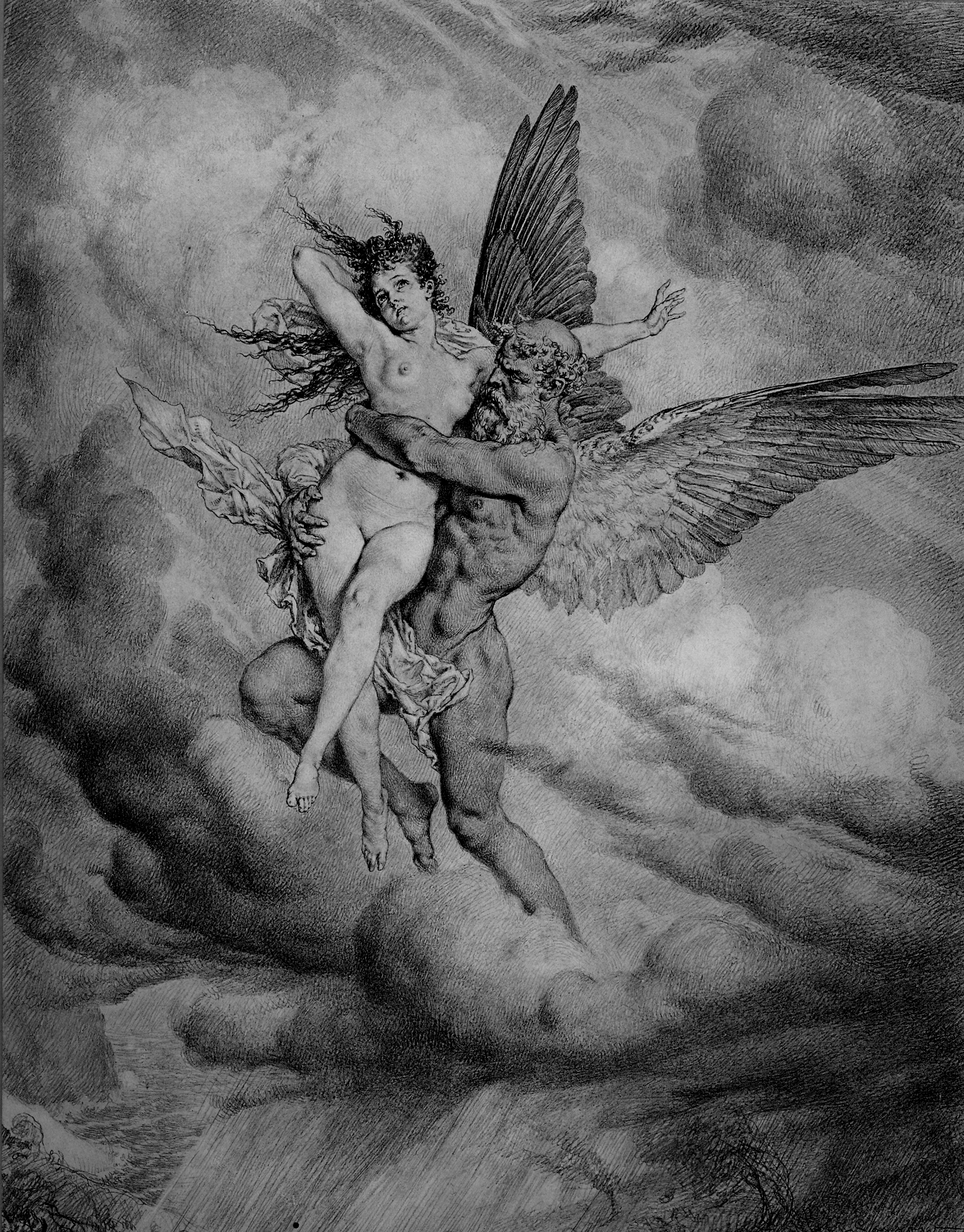
The abduction by German painter and illustrator Heinrich Lossow (1840-1897).

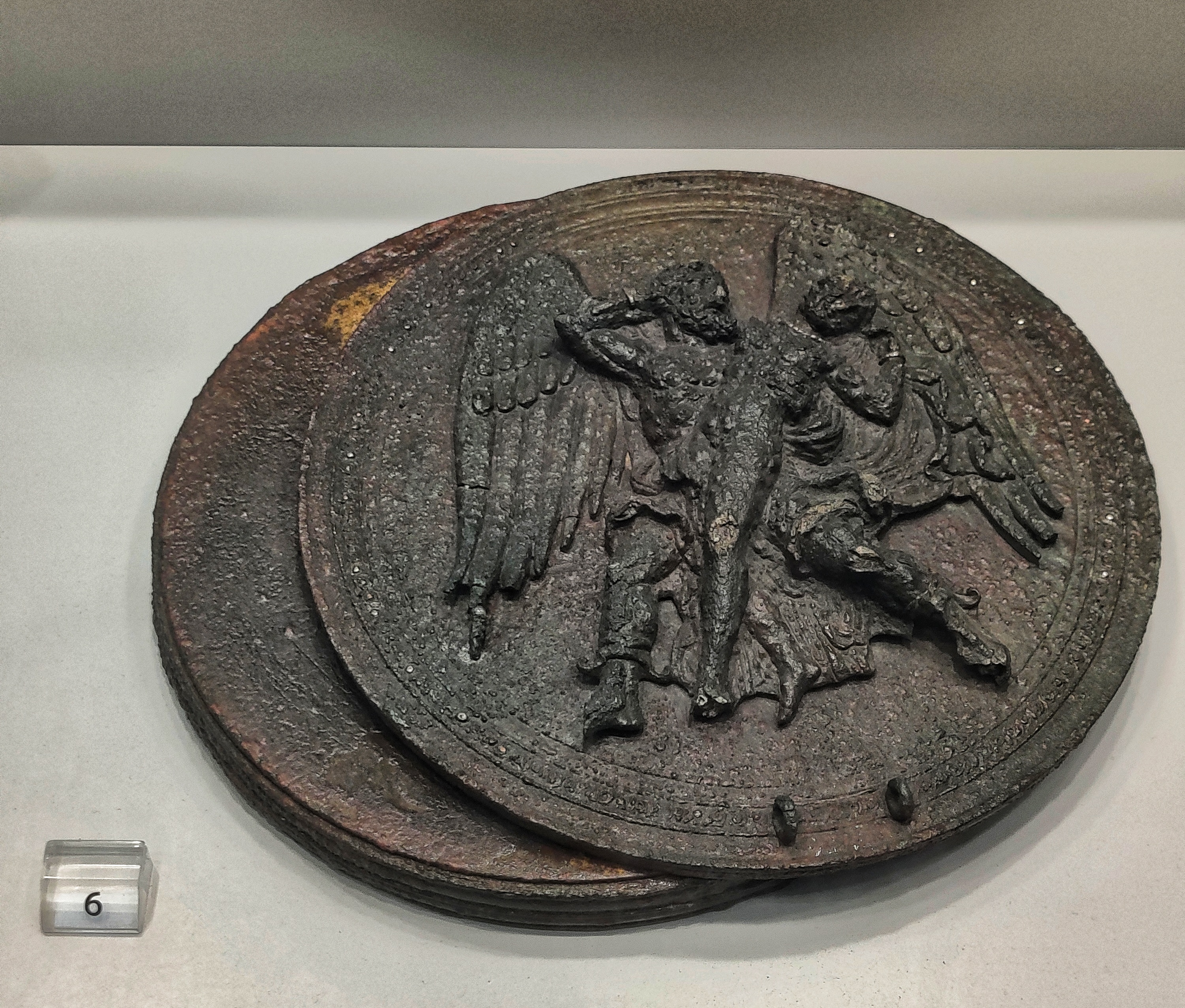
Boreas and Oreithyia on a mirror, pos-300 BC, from Eretria.

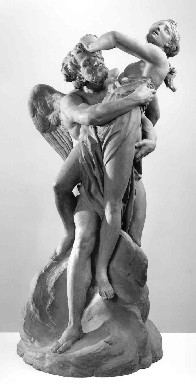
Boreas abducting Oreithyia, ca. 1800-1812, wood statue by Jan Frans van Geel.

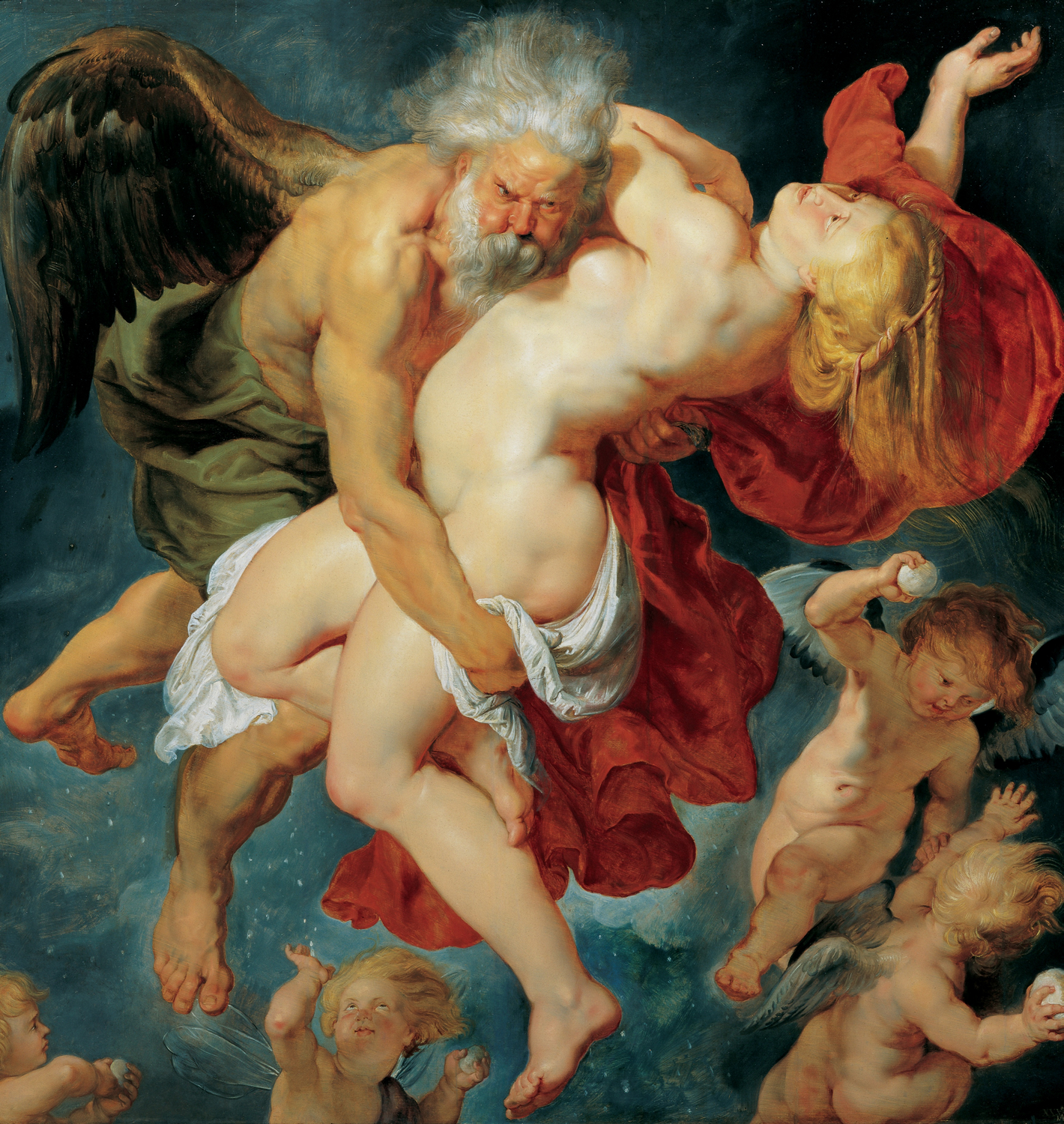
The Rape of Orithyia by Boreas, oil on canvas, by Peter Paul Rubens.

== Bibliography ==
- Diodorus Siculus, Bibliotheca Historica. Vol 1–2. Immanel Bekker. Ludwig Dindorf. Friedrich Vogel. in aedibus B. G. Teubneri. Leipzig. 1888–1890. Greek text available at the Perseus Digital Library.
- Forbes Irving, Paul M. C. (1990). Metamorphosis in Greek Myths. Oxford, New York, Toronto: Oxford University Press, Clarendon Press. ISBN 0-19-814730-9.
- Hesiod, Theogony, in The Homeric Hymns and Homerica with an English Translation by Hugh G. Evelyn-White, Cambridge, MA., Harvard University Press; London, William Heinemann Ltd. 1914. Online version at the Perseus Digital Library.
- Homer, The Iliad with an English Translation by A.T. Murray, PhD in two volumes. Cambridge, MA., Harvard University Press; London, William Heinemann, Ltd. 1924. Online version at the Perseus Digital Library.
- Hyginus, Gaius Julius, The Myths of Hyginus. Edited and translated by Mary A. Grant, Lawrence: University of Kansas Press, 1960.
- Nonnus, Dionysiaca; translated by Rouse, W H D, I Books I–XV. Loeb Classical Library No. 344, Cambridge, Massachusetts, Harvard University Press; London, William Heinemann Ltd. 1940. Internet Archive
- Pausanias, Pausanias Description of Greece with an English Translation by W.H.S. Jones, Litt.D., and H.A. Ormerod, M.A., in 4 Volumes. Cambridge, MA, Harvard University Press; London, William Heinemann Ltd. 1918. Online version at the Perseus Digital Library.
- Smith, William (1873). A Dictionary of Greek and Roman Biography and Mythology. London: John Murray, printed by Spottiswoode and Co. Online version at the Perseus.tufts library.
- Vergil, Aeneid. Theodore C. Williams. trans. Boston. Houghton Mifflin Co. 1910. Online version at the Perseus Digital Library.
