= Velificatio =

Stylistic device used in ancient Roman art

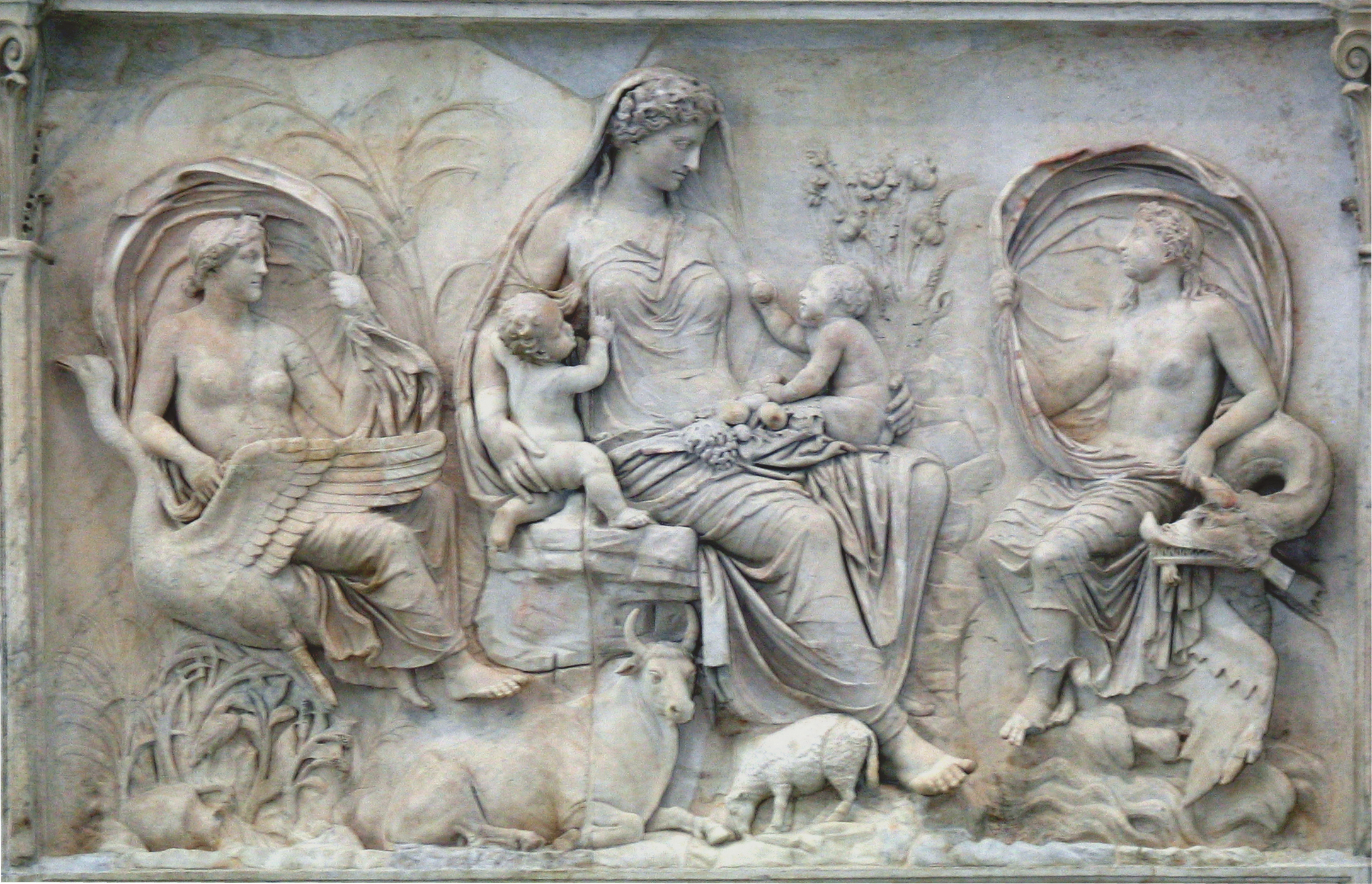
A pair of velificantes on the Augustan Altar of Peace (late 1st century BC)

Velificatio is a stylistic device used in ancient Roman art to frame a deity by means of a billowing garment. It represents "vigorous movement," an epiphany, or "the vault of heaven," often appearing with celestial, weather, or sea deities. It is characteristic of the iconography of the Aurae, the Breezes personified, and one of the elements which distinguish representations of Luna, the Roman goddess of the Moon, alluding to her astral course.

A figure so framed is a velificans (plural velificantes). Not all deities are portrayed as velificantes, but the device might be used to mark a member of the Imperial family who had been divinized (a divus or diva).

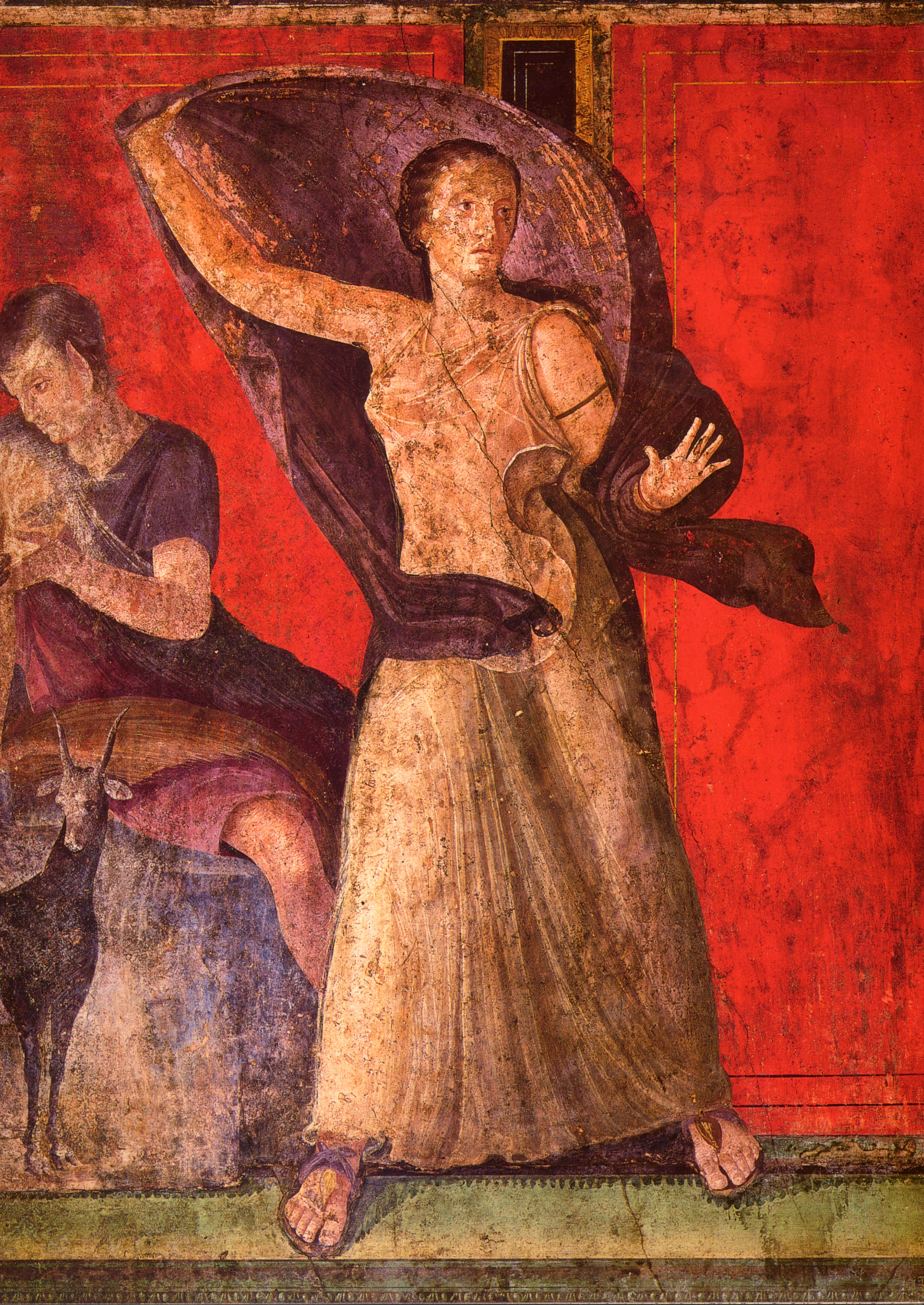
Villa of the Mysteries, Pompei, 1st century

Velificatio is a frequent device in Roman art, including painting, mosaic, relief, and sculpture, though it poses technical difficulties for freestanding sculpture. The Athenian sculptor Praxiteles was able to achieve it. The term is also used to describe Hellenistic art. The device continued to be used in later Western art, in which it is sometimes described as an aura, "a breeze that blows from either without or from within that lifts the veil to reveal the face of an otherwise invisible being."

== Usage and examples ==
In classical Latin, the abstract noun velificatio is uncommon, and refers to the act of setting sail, from velum, "sail" (but also "cloth, garment, veil") and the -fic- combining element from -ficio, -ficere (= facio, facere, "do, make"). The verbal form was the basis for modern scholarly usage. Pliny describes Aurae velificantes sua veste, the Breezes "making a sail with their own garment" at the Porticus Octaviae ("Portico of Octavia"). Such depictions of the Aurae are known from extant Roman art, and have been used as comparative material to identify the pair of velificantes in a scene from the Augustan Altar of Peace. On the basis of a passage from the Carmen Saeculare of Horace, composed and performed for Augustus's staging of the Saecular Games in 17 BC, the central figure is often identified as Tellus (Earth):

Fertile in produce and cattle, let Tellus grant Ceres a crown of grain; let the healthful waters and breezes of Jove nourish offspring.

Not all scholars agree on this analysis of the scene. The creatures on which the velificantes are seated also suggest Nereids, and the reference may point to the Cult of the Nymphs.

The significance of the veil is sometimes explained in terms of the initiation rites of the mystery religions. Initiates wore drapery or a veil which was lifted by a priestess. The veil was a symbol of death, and its removal in the rite signified the initiate's rebirth. The velificatio thus appears in scenes on sarcophagi and in other funerary art.

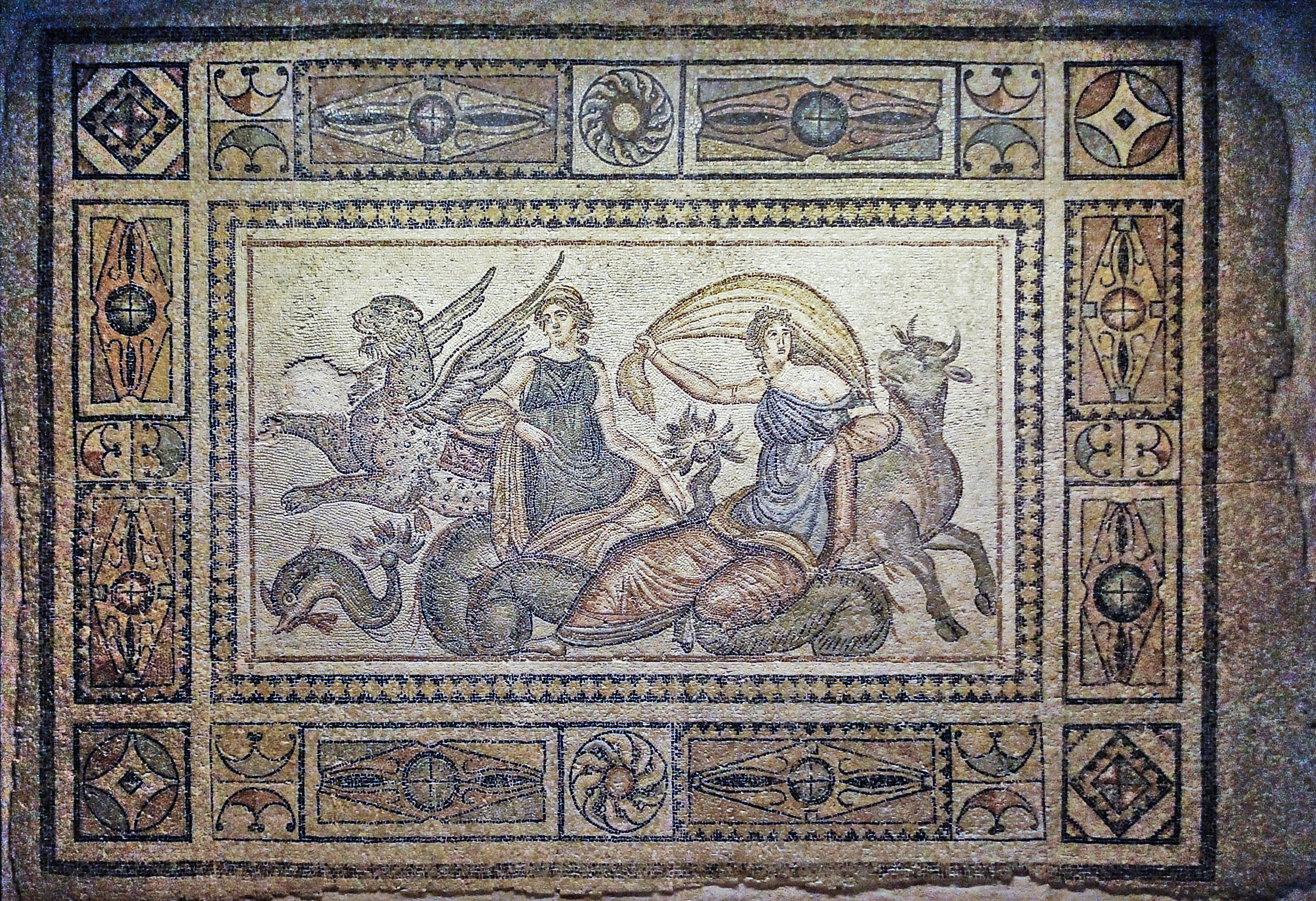
Europa (mosaic, 1st–2nd century)

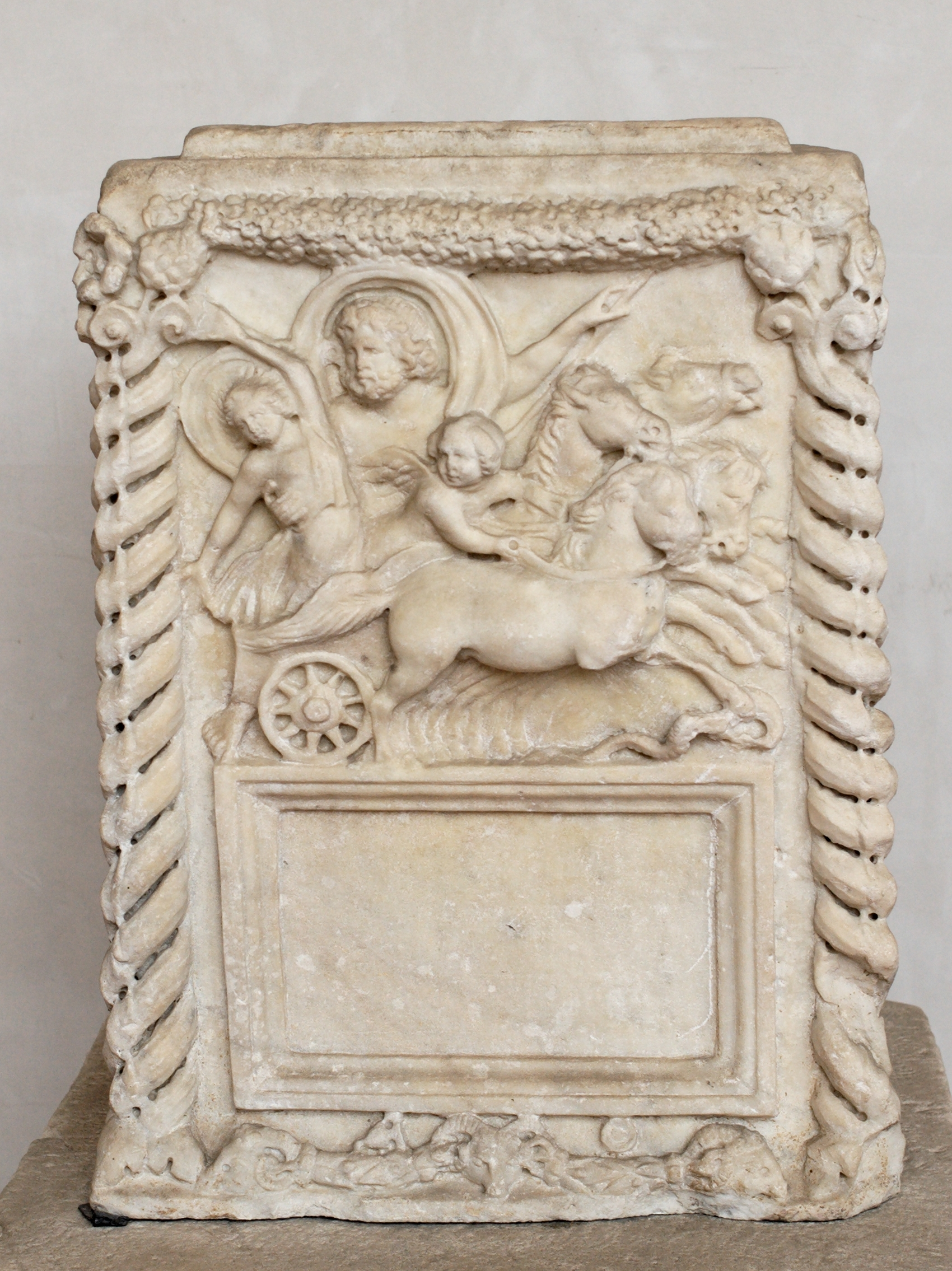
Pluto (cinerary urn, 2nd century)

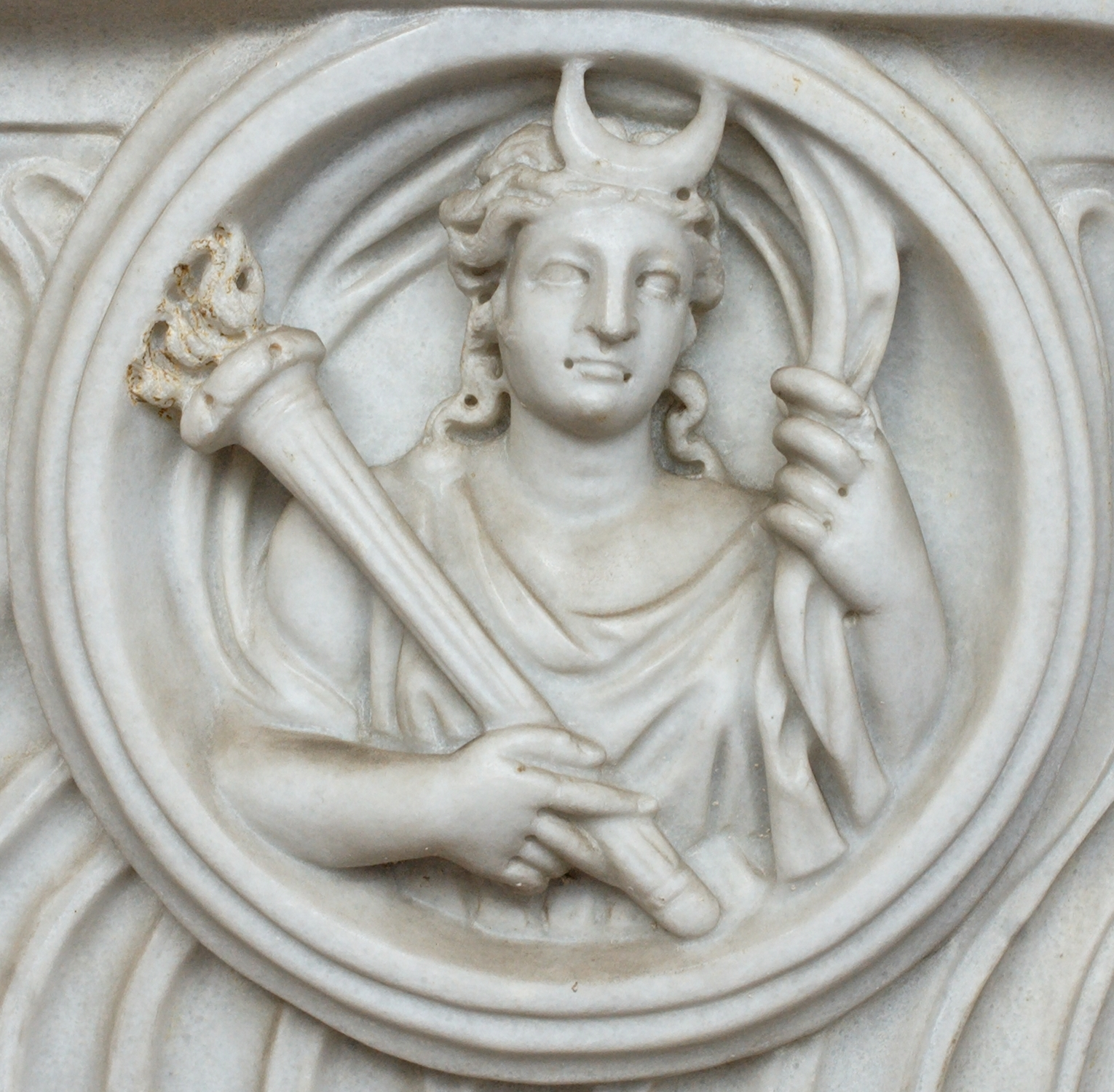
Selene (clipeus from a sarcophagus, early 3rd century)

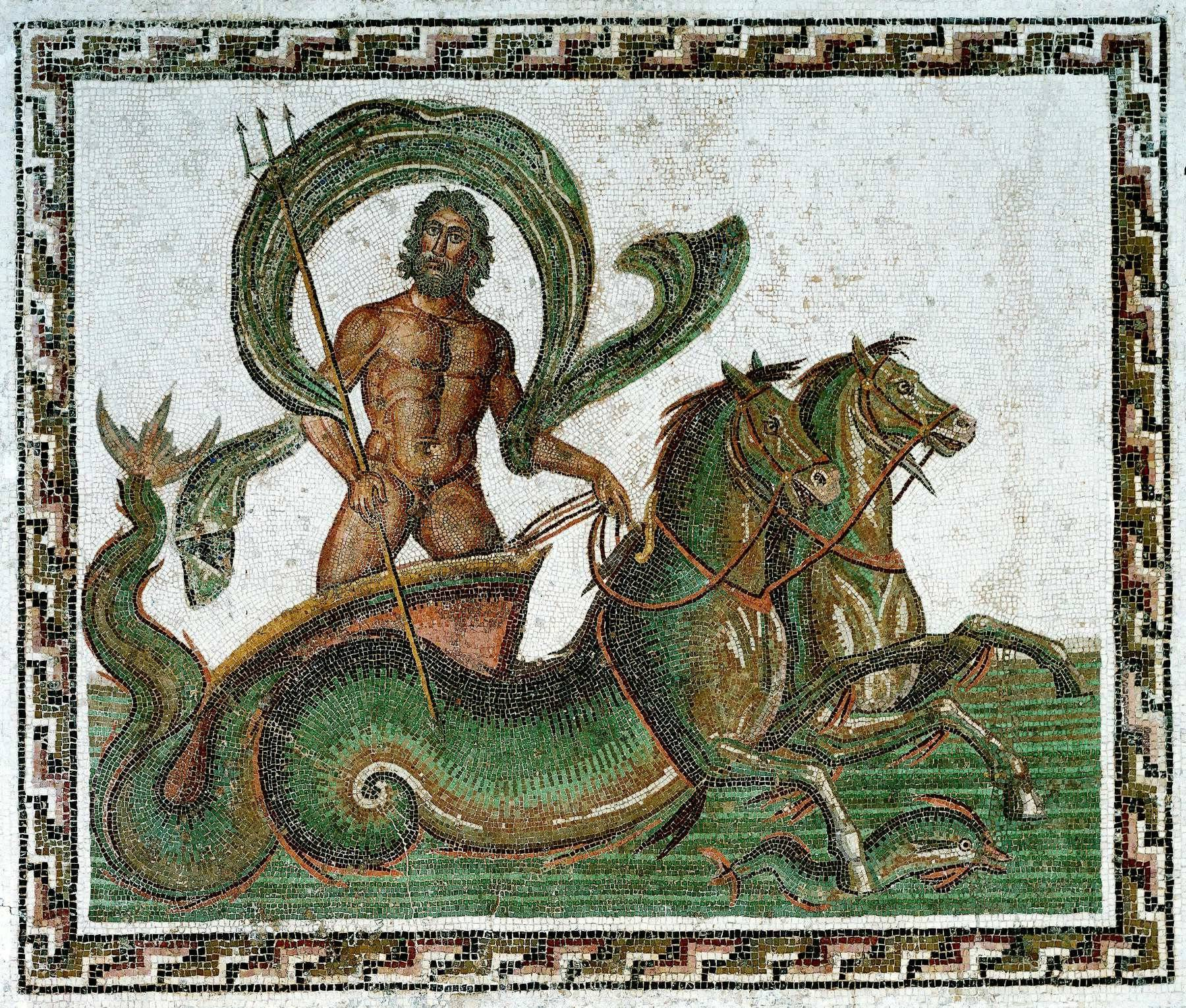
Neptune (mosaic, 3rd century)

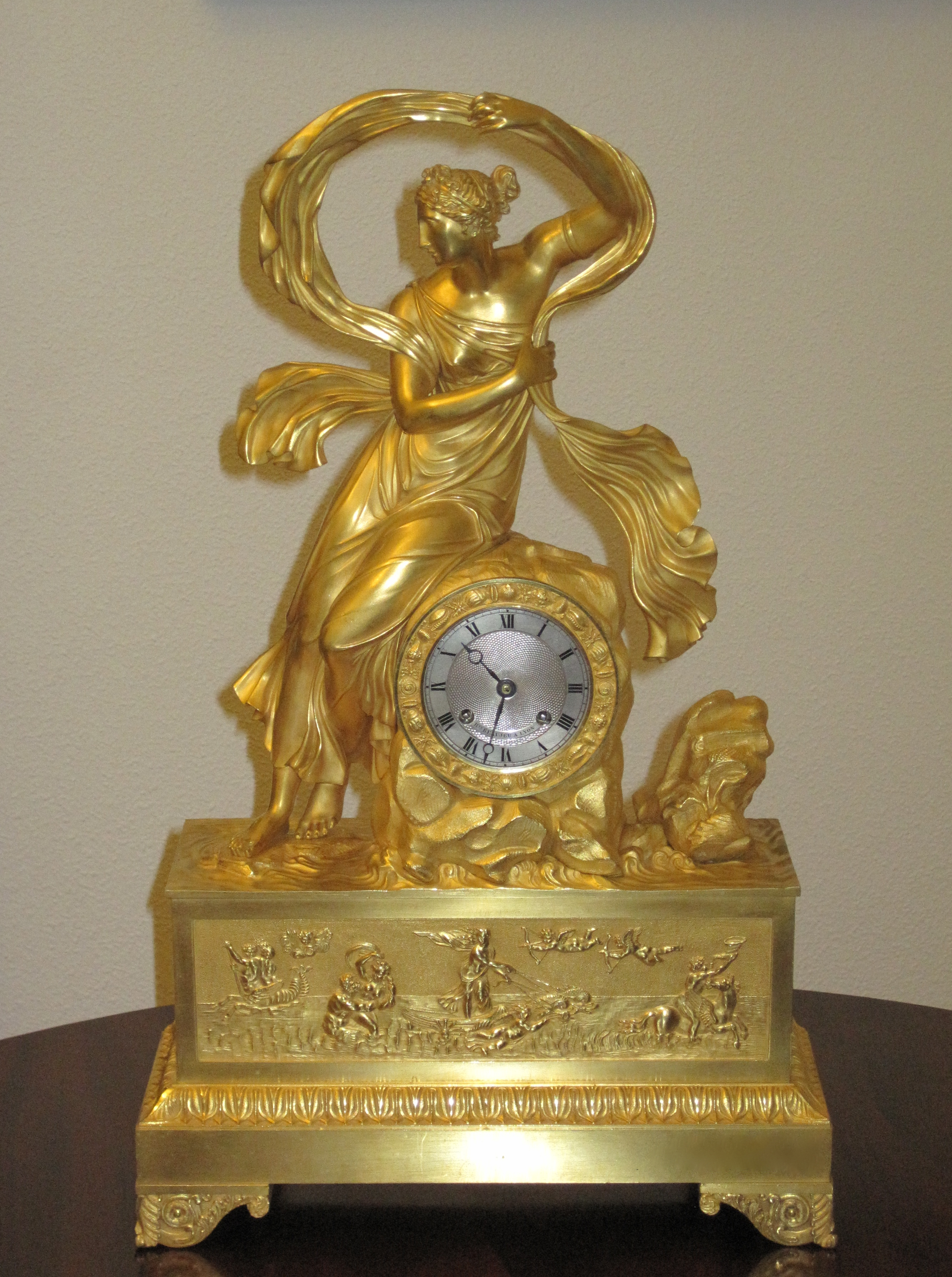
French Empire mantel clock (1822) depicting the nereid Galatea

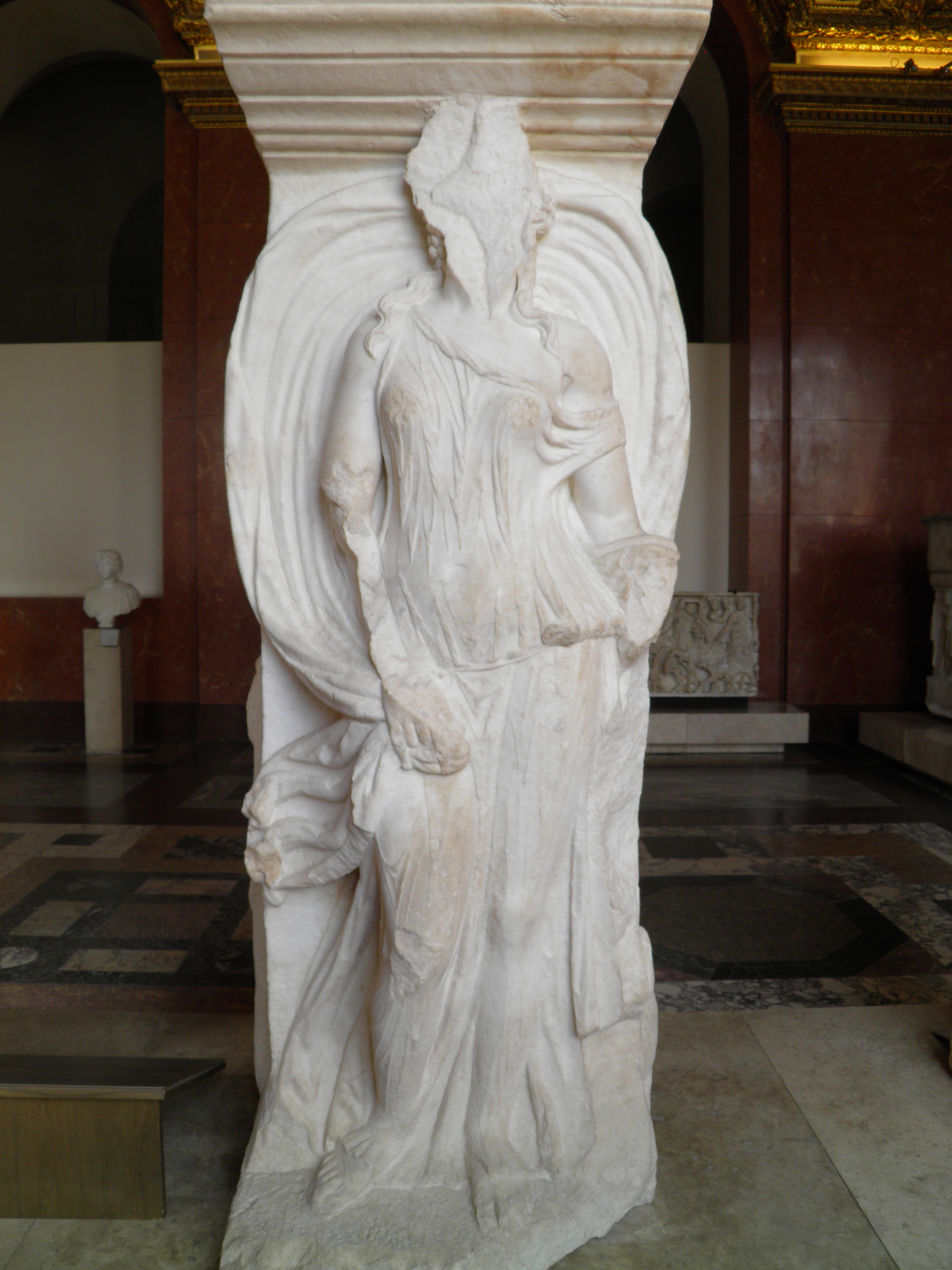
Aura of Las Incantadas (marble relief, 2nd century AD)

=== Outside Greco-Roman culture ===
Greek deities were abundantly used in Greco-Buddhist art, so too their depiction elements, as with the Boreas and its velificatio element. Boreas became the Japanese wind god Fujin through the Greco-Buddhist Wardo/Oado and Chinese Feng Bo/Feng Po ("Uncle Wind"; among various other names), spreading the velificatio as an element of portraying deities of the sky.

== List of velificantes ==
The velificatio motif may be found with numerous deities, divine beings, and divi, including:

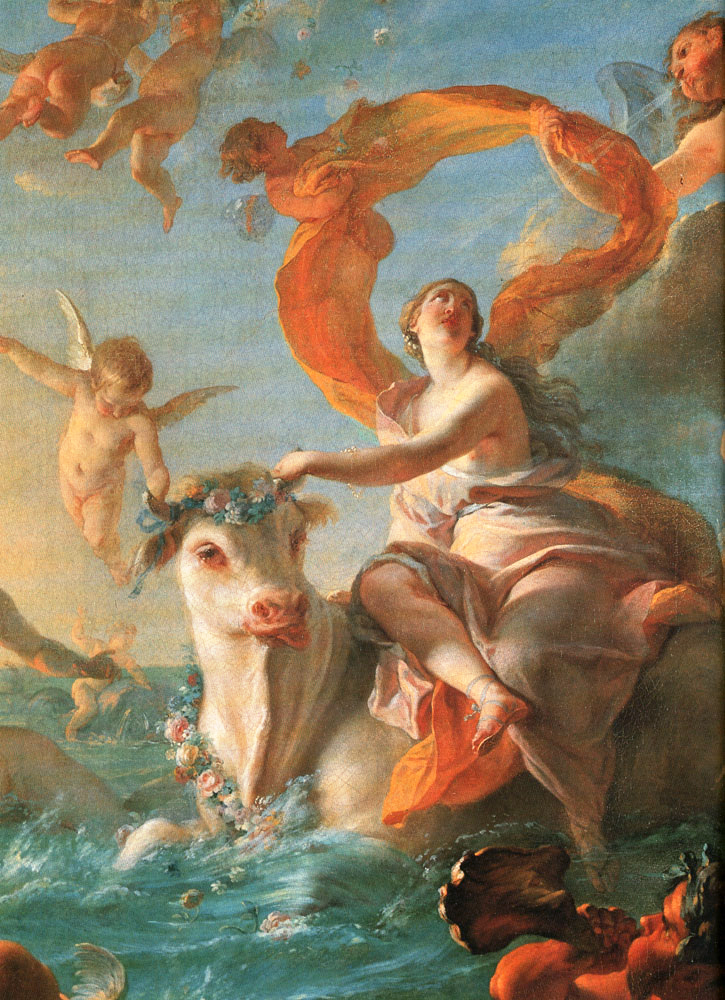
Enlèvement d'Europe (1726–27) by Noël-Nicolas Coypel

- Nyx
- Aura
- Nereids
- Horae (Seasons)
- Maenads
- Niobids
- Niobe
- Selene or Luna
- Helios
- Caelus
- Europa
- Dionysus
- Ariadne
- Poseidon or Neptune
- Amphitrite
- Aphrodite or Venus
- Mars
- Tarpeia
- Vibia Sabina

== See also ==
- Halo (religious iconography)
- Aureola
- Aura (paranormal)
