= Daeira =

Greek divinity

- Oceanid of Eleusis
- Abode: Eleusis

Genealogy
- Parents: Oceanus and Tethys
- Siblings: Oceanids and the river gods
- Consort: (1) Hermes (2) Eumolpus (3) ?Cadmus
- Offspring: (1) Eleusis (2) Immaradus (3) Semele

In Greek mythology, Daeira (Ancient Greek: Δάειρα, romanized: Dáeira) or Daera (Ancient Greek: Δαῖρα, romanized: Daîra) was a divinity connected with the Eleusinian mysteries. Her name means the "knowing one" from daô knowing which links well to the inside knowledge of the initiate.

== Family ==
Daeira was a daughter of the Titan Oceanus possibly by his sister-wife Tethys, thus one of the 3,000 Oceanids. Others called her simply as the sister of Styx (also an Oceanid).

By Hermes, Daira became the mother of Eleusis, eponym of the town of Eleusis. Otherwise, their son was called the child of Ogygus, the primeval king of Attica. In some myths, she borne Immarados to Eumolpos. Aristophanes said that Daeira was the mother of Semele.

== Mythology ==
According to Aischylos, Daeira was the same as Persephone. Others said she was Persephone's nurse; Persephone's jailer; identical with Aphrodite; identical with Demeter; identical with Hera; identical with Hekate; an enemy of Demeter, so that the latter's priestess avoided her rites.

The Eleusinian link is clearly fundamental, and confirmed by offerings to Daeira in an Eleusinian context in two if not three fifth- and fourth-century sacrificial calendars. The chaos in the myths even in the fifth century must be due in part to the secrecy of the Mysteries, but perhaps also to the unimportance of this particular kind of accuracy in ritual matters. An Attic religious official δαειρίης (Δαειρίης?) is attested by Pollux of whose ritual activity Daeira may have been a projection.
