= Tegyrios =

Mythical King of Thrace

In Greek mythology, Tegyrios (Ancient Greek: Τεγυριος) was a King of Thrace.

== Mythology ==
Tegyrios welcomed the exiled Eumolpus and married his daughter to Eumolpus' son Ismarus. Eumolpus then planned to overthrow him. Tegyrios banished him, but later, after the death of Ismarus, Tegyrios forgave Eumolpus and pronounced him his successor.
