= Colleteria =

Scientific classification
- Kingdom: Plantae
- Clade: Tracheophytes
- Clade: Angiosperms
- Clade: Eudicots
- Clade: Asterids
- Order: Gentianales
- Family: Rubiaceae
- Subfamily: Cinchonoideae
- Genus: Colleteria; David W.Taylor (2003)

Species
- Colleteria exserta (DC.) David W.Taylor; Colleteria seminervis (Urb. & Ekman) David W.Taylor

Synonyms
- Wandersong David W.Taylor (2014), nom. superfl.

Genus of Rubiaceae plants

Colleteria is a genus of flowering plants in the family Rubiaceae, native to Cuba, Hispaniola, and Puerto Rico. Among other differences from the genus Chione, from which they were split, they have fruit with two pyrenes.

== Species ==
Currently accepted species include:

- Colleteria exserta (DC.) David W.Taylor – southeastern Cuba and Hispaniola
- Colleteria seminervis (Urb. & Ekman) David W.Taylor – Puerto Rico
