= Cleopatra (mythology) =

Set of mythological Greek characters

In Greek mythology, Cleopatra (Ancient Greek: Κλεοπάτρα, romanized: Kleopátra, lit. 'glory of the father') was the name of the following women:

- Cleopatra, one of the fifty Danaids, the daughters of Danaus.
- Cleopatra, daughter of King Tros of Troy and Callirhoe, daughter of the river-god Scamander. She was the sister of Ilus, Assaracus, Ganymede and possibly, Cleomestra. Cleopatra and Cleomestra probably refer to the same individual.
- Cleopatra, daughter of Boreas (the North wind) and the Athenian princess Orithyia, sister to the Boreads and Chione. She was the first wife of Phineus by whom he had a pair of sons, named either Plexippus and Pandion, or Gerymbas and Aspondus, or Polydector (Polydectus) and Polydorus, or Parthenius and Crambis.
- Cleopatra, also called Alcyone, the wife of Meleager.
- Cleopatra, wife of King Deucalion of Crete and mother of Idomeneus.
- Cleopatra and Periboea of Locris, two maidens sent to the Trojan temple of Athena in retribution for Ajax the Lesser's sacrilege. This was done because three years after the Locrians had regained their country, they suffered a plague. Then an oracle bade them to propitiate Athena at Troy, sending two maidens as suppliants for a thousand years. The first lot fell on Periboea and Cleopatra, and after their deaths others were sent.
