= Boreads =

Mythological siblings

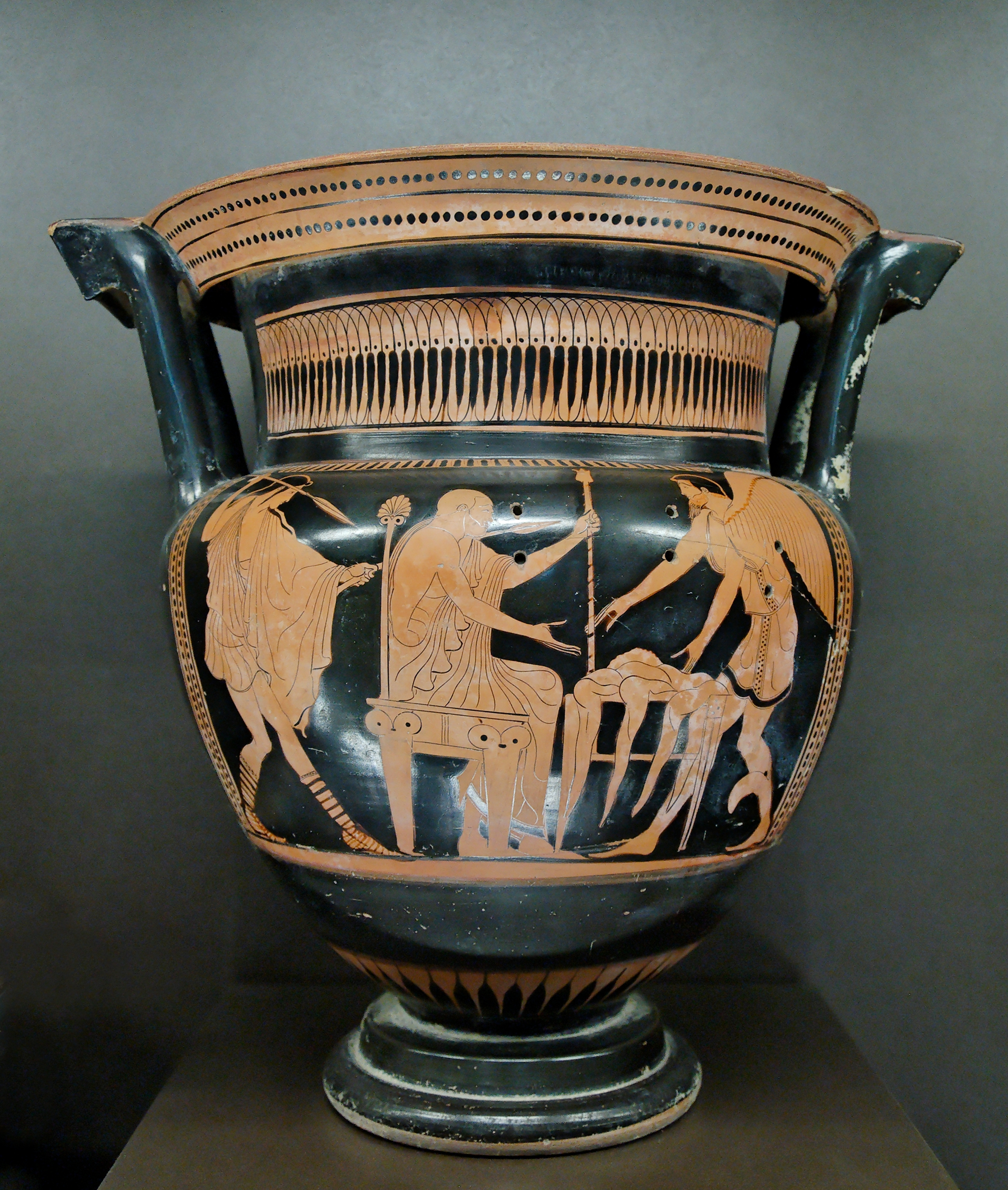
The Boreads rescuing Phineus from the Harpies, red-figure column-krater by the Leningrad Painter, c. 460 BC, Louvre.

The Boreads (Ancient Greek: Βορεάδαι, romanized: Boreádai, lit. 'sons of the north wind') are the two "wind brothers" in Greek mythology. They consist of Zetes (also Zethes) (Ancient Greek: Ζήτης) and Calaïs (Ancient Greek: Κάλαϊς). Their place of origin was Thrace, home of their father Boreas (the North wind).

== Description ==
Zetes and Calais were credited with very delicate and graceful hair, which was said to give them the ability to fly (though in some tales they have wings). They had great pride in who had the longest curls between the two of them and by boasting about these locks, they were uplifted. They had dusky wings which gleamed with golden scales.

== Mythology ==
Due to being sons of the north wind they were supernaturally gifted in different ways (depending on changes in the story from being passed down through generations and cultures) either being as fast as the wind or able to fly, having wings either on their feet or backs, depending on the myth. According to Ovid's Metamorphoses, their divine status showed in manhood when they sprouted wings on their backs.

They were Argonauts and played a particularly vital role in the rescue of Phineus from the harpies. They succeeded in driving the monsters away but did not kill them, at a request from the goddess of the rainbow, Iris, who promised that Phineus would not be bothered by the harpies again. As thanks, Phineus told the Argonauts how to pass the Symplegades. It is said that the Boreads were turned back by Iris at the Strophades. The islands' name, meaning "Islands of Turning", refers to this event.

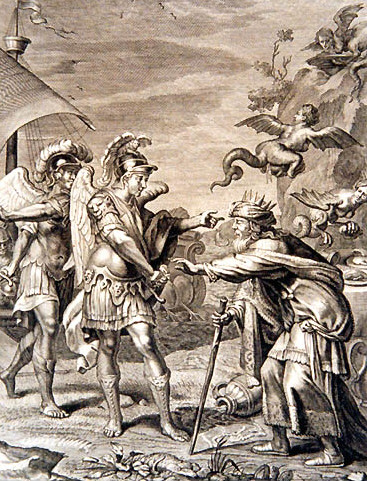
Calaïs et Zétès délivrent Phinée des Harpies ("Calais and zetes rescuing Phineus from the Harpies") by Bernard Picart.

According to Phanocles, Calais in one tradition was loved by the legendary singer Orpheus; Orpheus would sing out his heart's desire for Calais and gaze upon him, making the women of Thrace angry. Orpheus was said to have been killed at the hands of those jealous Thracian women whilst he wandered the countryside thinking of Calais.

Their death was said to be caused by Heracles in Tenos in revenge for when they convinced the Argonauts to leave him behind as he searched for Hylas in Mysia.

Other sources imply that the sons of Boreas died chasing the harpies, as it was fated that they would perish if they failed to catch those they pursued. In some versions, the harpies drop into the sea from exhaustion and so their pursuers fall as well.

Calais traditionally founded Cales in Campania.

== Genealogy ==
=== Parent and Siblings ===
The Boreads were the twin sons of Boreas and Oreithyia, daughter of King Erechtheus of Athens. They were the brothers of Chione and Cleopatra, wife of Phineus; king of Thrace.

=== Consorts ===
According to a rare variant of the myth by Tzetzes, the old man Phineus who was blind because of old age had two daughters named Eraseia and Harpyreia. These two lived in a very libertine and lazy life which was all wasted. Ultimately, the sisters abandoned themselves into poverty and fatal famine and were eventually snatched away by Zetes and Calais, disappearing from those places ever since.

In one version, Zetes was married to Aëdon, who began suspecting (perhaps correctly) that Zetes had fallen in love with a hamadryad nymph and was cheating on her. She further suspected that their son Aëtylus knew and was helping his father carry out the affair by covering up for him. In anger, Aëdon killed their son after he returned one day from hunting. In pity, Aphrodite changed the mother into a nightingale, which to this day mourns for her child. This story might be a result of mix-up with the names of Zetes and Zethus, who is traditionally Aëdon's husband as Zetes is otherwise unrelated to the story.

== See also ==
- Corpus vasorum antiquorum
