= Eumolpus =

Greek mythological character

- King of Thrace
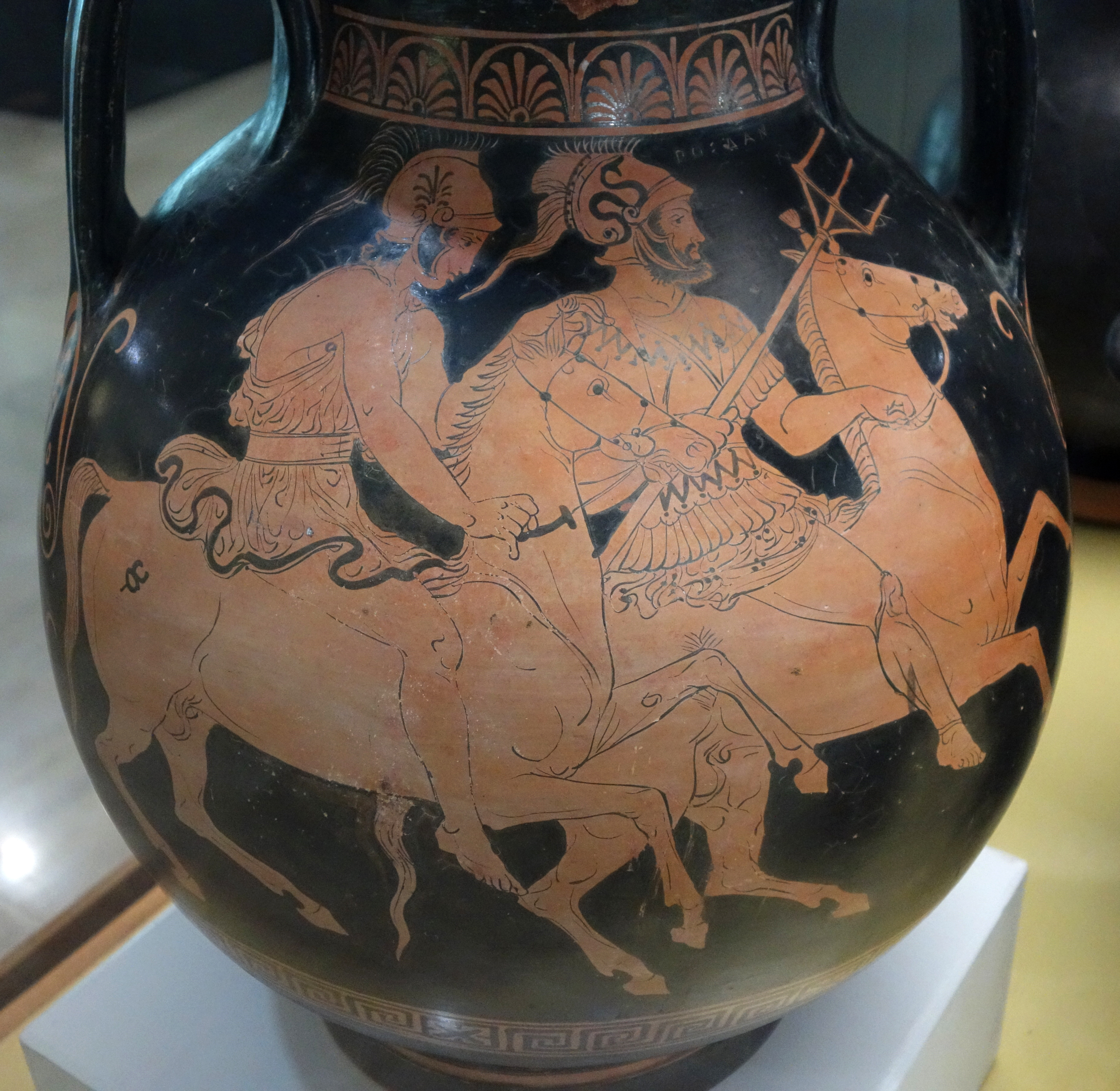
- Poseidon accompanied by a young warrior, sometimes identified as Eumolpus. Lucanian red-figure pelike, c. 420–400 BCE, from Heraclea, Lucania.
- Abode: Thrace and later Eleusis
- Parents: Poseidon and Chione or Apollo and Astycome
- Consort: (1) Daeira (2) Selene
- Offspring: (1 Immaradus (2) Musaeus; Ceryx; ?Phorbas

In Greek Mythology, Eumolpus (/juˈmɒlpəs/; Ancient Greek: Εὔμολπος, romanized: Eúmolpos, lit. ''good singer' or 'sweet singing', derived from εὖ eu 'good' and μολπή molpe 'song', 'singing') was a legendary king of Thrace. He was described as having come to Attica either as a bard, a warrior, or a priest of Demeter and Dionysus.

== Family ==
Eumolpus was the son of Poseidon (Neptune in Roman tradition) and Chione. In the legend he is described as neither Greek, nor Thracian or Roman, but Libyan and a native of North Africa, though his mother Chione is said to be a Thracian princess. An alternative genealogy also stated that Eumolpus was born to the god Apollo and the nymph Astycome. He was the father of Immarados by the Oceanid Daeira.

== Mythology ==
=== Early years ===
According to the mythographer Apollodorus, Chione, daughter of Boreas and the heroine Oreithyia, pregnant in secret with Eumolpus by Poseidon, was frightened of her father's reaction so she threw the baby into the ocean after giving birth to him. Poseidon however, looked after him and brought him to shore in Ethiopia, where Benthesikyme, a daughter of Poseidon and Amphitrite, raised the child as their own. When he grew up, Eumolpus married one of Benthesikyme's two daughters by her Ethiopian husband. Eumolpus however, loved a different daughter and made an attempt upon her chastity, and was banished because of this. He went to Thrace with his son Ismarus (or Immaradus) who was married to the daughter of King Tegyrius. Later on, Eumolpus was discovered in a plot to overthrow King Tegyrios and was obliged to take flight and fled to Eleusis where he formed a friendship with the Eleusinians.

In Eleusis, Eumolpus became one of the first priests of Demeter and one of the founders of the Eleusinian Mysteries. When Ismarus died, Tegyrios sent for Eumolpus to return to Thrace, they made peace and Eumolpus inherited the Thracian kingdom. During a war between Athens and Eleusis, Eumolpus sided with Eleusis and came with a numerous band of Thracians.

=== War with Athens ===
The traditions about this Eleusinian war, however, differ very much. According to some, the Eleusinians under Eumolpus attacked the Athenians under Erechtheus, but were defeated, and Eumolpus with his two sons, Phorbas and Immaradus, were slain. Pausanias relates a tradition that in the battle between the Eleusinians and Athenians, Erechtheus and Immaradus fell, and that thereupon peace was concluded on condition that the Eleusinians should in other respects be subject to Athens, but that they alone should have the celebration of their mysteries, and that Eumolpus and the daughters of Celeus should perform the customary sacrifices. His son, Immaradus, was killed by King Erechtheus. In some sources, Erechtheus having killed Eumolpus, Poseidon asked Zeus to avenge his son's death. Zeus killed Erechtheus with a lightning bolt or Poseidon made the earth open up and swallow Erechtheus. According to Hyginus, Eumolpus came to Attica with a colony of Thracians, to claim the country as the property of his father, Poseidon.

Eleusis lost the battle with Athens but the Eumolpides and Kerykes, two families of priests to Demeter, continued the Eleusinian mysteries. Eumolpus' youngest son, Herald-Keryx who succeeded him in the priestly office, founded the lines.

=== Other feats ===
Mythology regards Eumolpus as the founder of the Eleusinian mysteries, and as the first priest of Demeter and Dionysus; the goddess herself taught him, Triptolemus, Diocles, and Celeus, the sacred rites, and he is therefore sometimes described as having himself invented the cultivation of the vine and of fruit-trees in general.

Eumolpus was an excellent musician and singer; he played the aulos and the lyre. He won a musical contest in the funereal games of Pelias. Eumolpus was regarded as an ancient priestly bard, poems and writings on the mysteries were fabricated and circulated at a later time under his name. One hexameter line of a Dionysiac hymn, ascribed to him, is preserved in Diodorus. The legends connected him also with Heracles, whom he is said to have instructed in music, or initiated into the mysteries.

According to Diogenes Laërtius Eumolpus was the father of Musaeus. Lastly, according to Philochorus, Eumolpus was the father of the legendary poet Musaeus by the lunar goddess Selene.

The tomb of Eumolpus was shown both at Eleusis and Athens. The difference in the traditions about Eumolpus led some of the ancients to suppose that two or three persons of that name ought to be distinguished.

== Legacy ==
Vinzenz Brinkmann and Ulrike Koch-Brinkmann have identified a 5th-century bronze statue called Riace B as being a representation of Eumolpus. The fingers of the well-preserved statue indicate that the figure was originally carrying a bow and arrow, typical of Thracian warriors.
