= Immaradus =

Greek mythological character

In Greek mythology, Immaradus (Ancient Greek: Ἰμμάραδος, romanized: Immárados) is a Thracian prince as the son of King Eumolpus of Thrace and the Oceanid nymph Daeira.

== Mythology ==
During the war between Eleusis and Athens, Immaradus led the Thracian armies on the side of Eleusis. He was killed by Erechtheus, king of Athens.
