= Colleteria exserta =

Scientific classification
- Kingdom: Plantae
- Clade: Tracheophytes
- Clade: Angiosperms
- Clade: Eudicots
- Clade: Asterids
- Order: Gentianales
- Family: Rubiaceae
- Genus: Colleteria
- Species: C. exserta

Binomial name
- Colleteria exserta (DC.) David W.Taylor (2003)

Synonyms
- Chione exserta (DC.) Urb. (1921); Chione lucida Griseb. (1862); Psychotria exserta DC. (1830) (basionym); Uragoga exserta (DC.) Kuntze (1891); Wandersong exserta (DC.) David W.Taylor (2014)

Species of flowering plant

Colleteria exserta is a species of flowering plant in the family Rubiaceae. It is a tree or shrub native to southeastern Cuba and Hispaniola, where it grows from coastal to mountain areas between 20 and 1300 meters elevation.

It is one of two species in genus Colleteria, along with Colleteria seminervis from Puerto Rico. It is distinguished from C. seminervis by its longer and wider leaf blades, larger number of secondary leaf veins, longer petioles, longer inter-petiolar stipules, and larger number of flowers per inflorescence (13–80 vs. 1–3).
