= Chione (daughter of Arcturus) =

Figure in Greek mythology

In Greek mythology, Chione (Ancient Greek: Χιόνη, romanized: Khióne, lit. 'snowy', from χιών, khión, "snow") was a consort of Boreas, the god of the north wind.

== Mythology ==
The account of Pseudo-Plutarch makes her a daughter of Arcturus; she is said to have been abducted by Boreas and brought by him to Mount Niphantes, where she gave birth to their son Hyrpax, who later inherited the throne of King Heniochus; the mountain was said to have been called "The Bed of Boreas" from that circumstance. The name of Hyrpax is otherwise unknown, but Aelian mentions Boreas and Chione as the parents of three Hyperborean priests of Apollo; according to Diodorus Siculus, a whole dynasty of Hyperborean kings and priests claimed descent from Boreas.

== Interpretation ==
Although generally this Chione is seen as different from Boreas' own daughter of the same name, Renaud Gagné has suggested that they are supposed to be the same person in fact.
