= Chione (daughter of Boreas) =

Daughter of Boreas in Greek mythology

- Daughter of Boreas
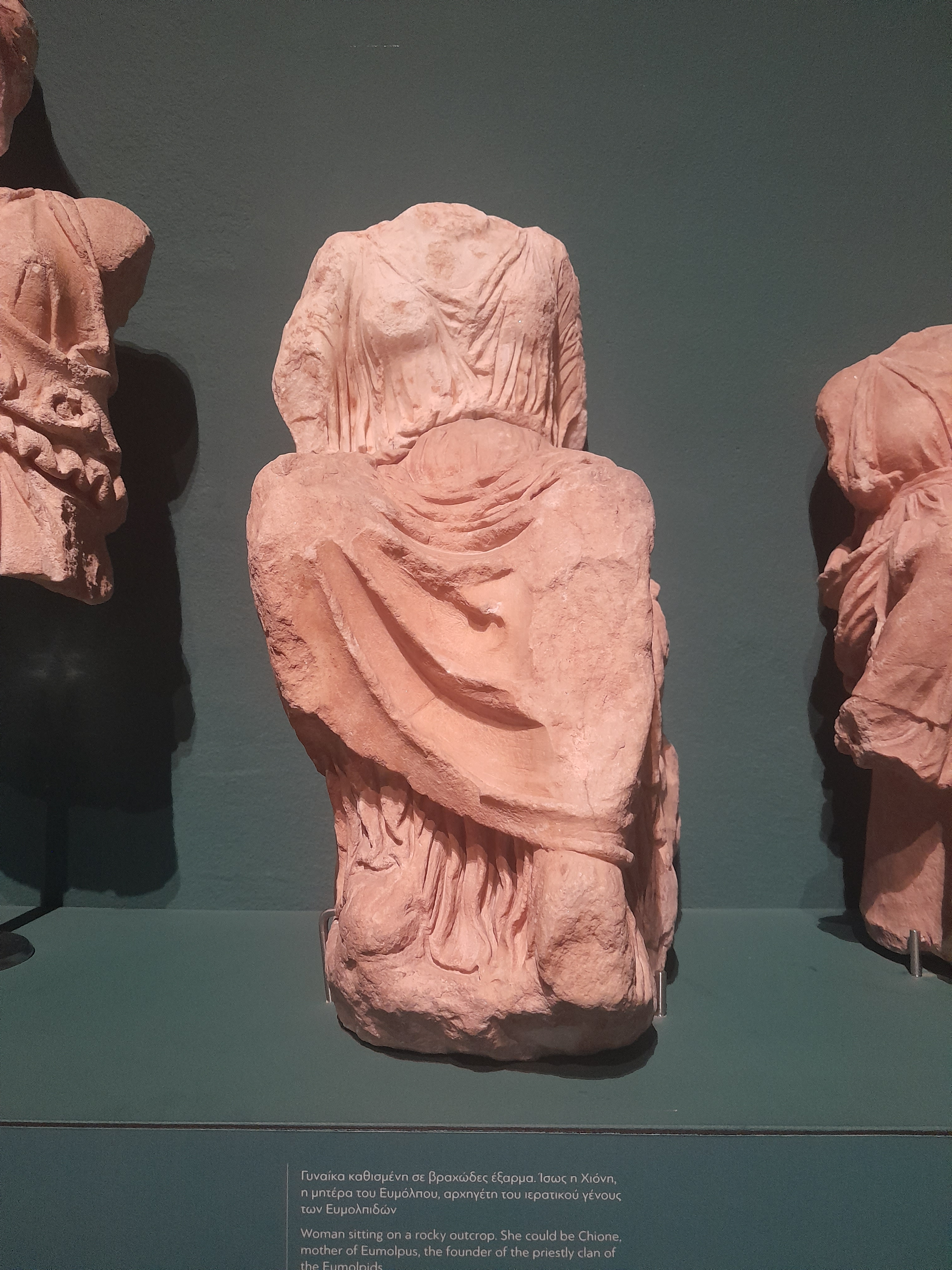
- A sitting female figure, possibly Chione, from the pediment of the Temple of Sabina at Eleusis, Greece.

Genealogy
- Parents: Boreas (father); Orithyia (mother)
- Siblings: Boreads, Cleopatra
- Consort: Poseidon
- Children: Eumolpus

In Greek mythology, Chione (/kaɪˈoʊniː/; Ancient Greek: Χιόνη, romanized: Khiónē, lit. 'snowy') is a mortal woman, the daughter of Boreas, the god of the north wind, and the princess Orithyia, a daughter of Erechtheus, the king of Athens. In the only myth concerning her, Chione sleeps with the sea-god Poseidon and bears him a son, Eumolpus, but in fear of her father's wrath she casts the infant into the sea.

== Etymology ==
The girl's name Χιόνη is derived from the ancient Greek word for snow, χιών (khiṓn), a 'fitting' name for the daughter of the cold, northern wind. The word is derived from the Indo-European root *ǵʰéyōm, translating to 'snow,' and is cognate with the words χεῖμα (kheîma, meaning snow) and χειμών (kheimṓn, meaning winter).

== Family ==
Chione was born to Boreas, the god of the north wind, and the Athenian princess Orithyia. She was thus the sister of Cleopatra (wife of Phineus, king of Thrace) and the Argonauts Calaïs and Zetes (collectively known as the Boreads).

== Mythology ==
Chione's only myth relates how she became the mother of Poseidon's son Eumolpus whom she then threw into the ocean for fear of her father Boreas' reaction; however, Eumolpus is rescued and raised by Poseidon.

== Interpretation ==
Eumolpus was seen as the first hierophant and ancestor of the Eleusinian clan; in that case, the myth of Chione casting him into the sea might be an allegory of hieronymy, a ritual in which the hierophant consigned their previous name to the sea.

Although generally distinct, Renaud Gagné has proposed that this Chione is meant to be the same as Chione, the mother of Boreas' three Hyperborean sons, otherwise the daughter of Arcturus.

== See also ==
Other princesses who abandoned their infants in Greek myth:

- Tyro, Thessalian princess
- Alope, Eleusinian princess
- Antiope, Theban princess
