= Chione venosa =

Scientific classification
- Kingdom: Plantae
- Clade: Tracheophytes
- Clade: Angiosperms
- Clade: Eudicots
- Clade: Asterids
- Order: Gentianales
- Family: Rubiaceae
- Subfamily: Cinchonoideae
- Genus: Chione; DC.
- Species: C. venosa

Binomial name
- Chione venosa (Sw.) Urb.

Synonyms
- (Genus): Crusea A.Rich.; Oregandra Standl.; Sacconia Endl.; (Species): Jacquinia venosa Sw.

Species of plant

Chione is a monotypic genus of flowering plants in the family Rubiaceae containing the single species Chione venosa. It is native to the neotropics, occurring in most of Mexico, and throughout Central America, the Caribbean, Colombia, Ecuador, and Peru. It is typically a tree growing 10 to 20 meters tall. In harsh habitats, it may be dwarfed and shrubby. It has no known economic use.

== Systematics ==
The genus Chione was erected by de Candolle in his Prodromus in 1830. The name of the genus is derived from the Greek word chion, meaning snow. The biological type for the genus are those plants which de Candolle called Chione glabra. These are now included in Chione venosa var. venosa but per ICN, Chione glabra retains its status as type.

Some authors have assigned as many as 15 species to Chione, but usually only one species is recognized, Chione venosa. In 2003, two species were removed from Chione and placed in a new genus, Colleteria. The remaining species of Chione were combined into one species, Chione venosa, with four varieties. Chione and Colleteria are the only genera in the subfamily Cinchonoideae that have not been assigned to a tribe. They will be placed in a tribe, possibly a new one, after further morphological study.

=== Varieties ===
- Chione venosa var. buxifolia (Dwyer & M.V.Hayden) David W.Taylor – Panama
- Chione venosa var. cubensis (A.Rich.) David W.Taylor – Cuba, Haiti, Dominican Republic
- Chione venosa var. mexicana (Standl.) David W.Taylor – Mexico
- Chione venosa var. venosa – southern Mexico, Central America, Dominican Republic, Haiti, Puerto Rico, Trinidad, Lesser Antilles, Colombia, Ecuador, Peru
