= Famianus of Compostela =

Catholic Saint (1090–1150)

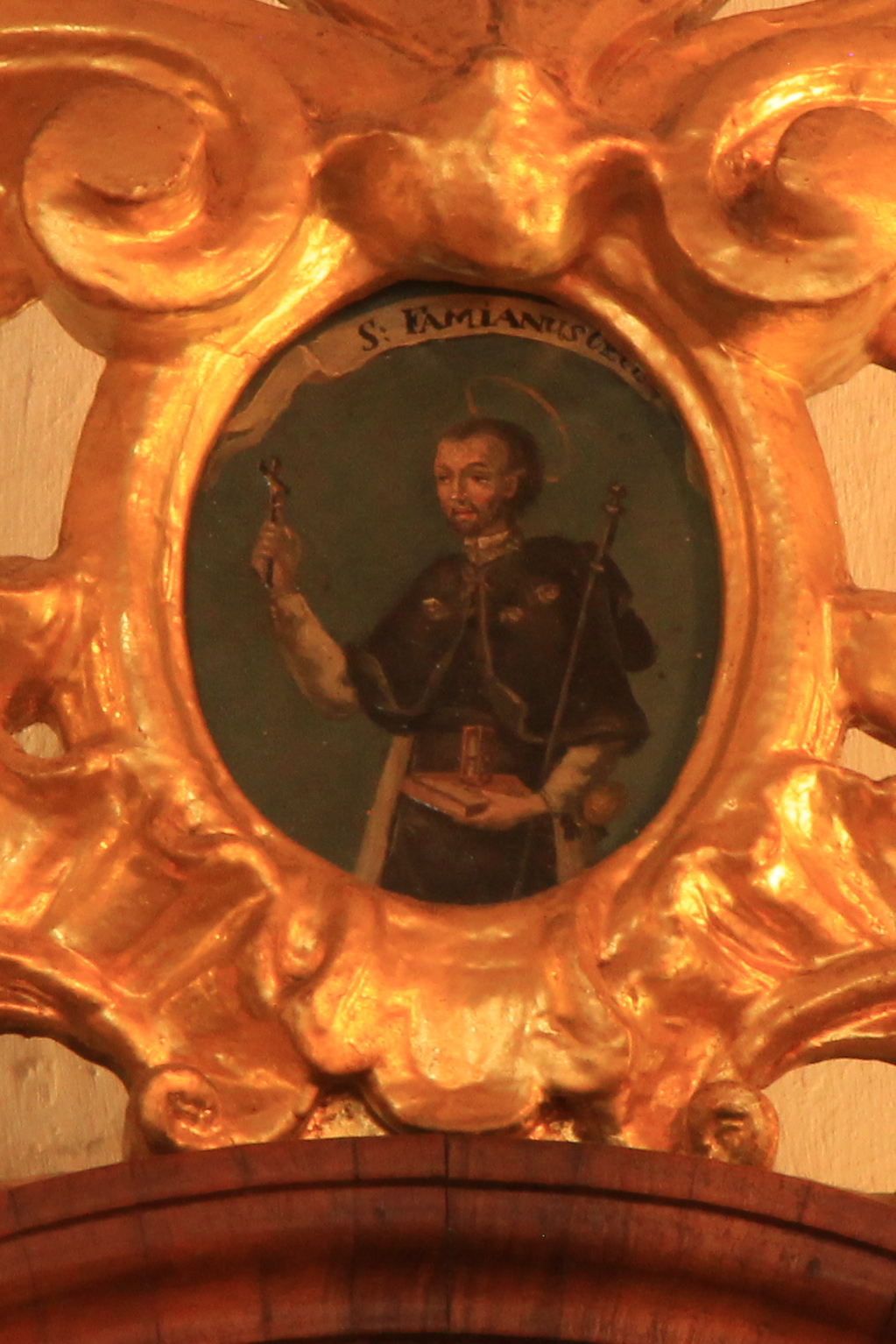
- Born: 1090; Cologne, Holy Roman Empire (Present day Germany)
- Died: 1150; Gallese, Papal States(Present day Italy)
- Honored in: Catholic Church
- Canonized: 1154
- Feast: August 8

St Famianus of Compostela (1090–1150) was a Catholic Saint. He was canonized by Pope Adrian IV in 1455

== Biography ==
Famianus was born in 1090 to a wealthy family. However, he left his wealthy life and gave all of his property to the poor. Afterwards, he lived the life of a poor pilgrim. During this time period, he visited many Christian holy sites in Italy and Spain, including Rome. He eventually joined the Cistercian monastery of Santa María de Oseira in Spain. He went to the Holy Land in 1146. He died in Italy.

== Legacy ==
In 1511 Pope Julius II granted plenary indulgence to those who visited the saint's sanctuary in Gallese on his feast day; Pope Paul V confirmed the indulgence in 1607.
