= Pallene (mythology) =

In Greek mythology, the name Pallene (/pəˈliːniː/ pə-LEE-nee; Ancient Greek: Παλλήνη, romanized: Pallēnē) may refer to two Thracian characters:

- Pallene, one of the Alcyonides, daughters of the giant Alcyoneus. She was the sister of Alkippe, Anthe, Asteria, Drimo, Methone and Phthonia (Phosthonia or Chthonia). When their father was slain by Heracles, these girls threw themselves into the sea from Kanastraion, which is the peak of Pellene. They were then transformed into halcyons (kingfishers) by the goddess Amphitrite.
- Pallene, a Thracian princess, daughter of King Sithon and the nymph Mendeis or the naiad Achiroe, and the sister of Rhoeteia. She was wooed by Dryas and Clitus, and eventually married the latter, and had a daughter Chrysonoe (Torone), the wife of Proteus. Alternately, Pallene consorted with Dionysus.
