= Asteria (mythology) =

Individuals in Greek mythology

In Greek mythology, Asteria (/əˈstɪəriə/; Ancient Greek: Ἀστερία, lit. 'of the stars' or 'starry one') was a name attributed to several distinct individuals.

== Individuals ==
- Asteria, a minor goddess who became the island Ortygia or Delos, daughter of Phoebe and Coeus and sister to Leto.
- Asteria or Astris, daughter of Helios and Clymene or Ceto, one of the Heliades. She married the river god Hydaspes (the modern Jhelum River) and became mother of Deriades, king in India.
- Asteria, one of the Danaïdes, daughters of Danaus who, with one exception, murdered their husbands on their wedding nights. She was, briefly, the bride of Chaetus.
- Asteria, one of the Alcyonides, daughters of the giant Alcyoneus. She was the sister of Alkippe, Anthe, Drimo, Pallene, Methone and Phthonia (Phosthonia or Chthonia). When their father Alcyoneus was slain by Heracles, these girls threw themselves into the sea from Kanastraion, which is the peak of Pallene. They were then transformed into halcyons (kingfishers) by the goddess Amphitrite.
- Asteria, daughter of Hydeus, was the mother of Hydissos by Bellerophon. Her son is known for having founded a city in Caria which was named after him.
- Asteria, daughter of Coronus, and Apollo were possible parents of the seer Idmon.
- Asteria or Asterodia, mother of Crisus and Panopeus by Phocus.
- Asteria, daughter of Teucer and Eune of Cyprus.
- Asteria, the ninth Amazon killed by Heracles when he came for Hippolyta's girdle.
- Asteria, an Athenian maiden among the would-be sacrificial victims of Minotaur, portrayed in a vase painting.

== In popular culture ==
- Christoph Willibald Gluck gave the name Asteria to a character in his 1765 opera Telemaco; however, the name did not appear in Homer's Odyssey, on which the opera is based.
- Multiple characters named Asteria appear in the DC Universe and the DC Extended Universe:
  - Asteria first appeared in the 1998 one-shot issue Elseworld's Finest: Supergirl & Batgirl; "her origin or background isn't touched upon, but she does seem to be Amazon stock".
  - Another version of Asteria appeared in the 2018 issues Justice League/Aquaman: Drowned Earth Special #1 and Justice League #11. In the first issue, Asteria is a two-headed metallic bird. In the second issue, Wonder Woman informs Aquaman that "the name 'Asteria' belonged to an ancient Amazonian who fought against the gods. Her name means, of the sky".
  - In the 2020 film Wonder Woman 1984, Asteria is portrayed by Lynda Carter. The character is depicted as the greatest Amazon warrior. When mankind enslaved the Amazonian women, Asteria fought for their freedom, allowing Queen Hippolyta to free them and their race to escape to the island known as Themyscira. The island created by Zeus allowed the Amazons to remain hidden from mankind, while Asteria was venerated by the Amazons as a fallen hero. During the post-credits sequence, she is seen walking amongst a crowded street and saves a pedestrian from being hit by a falling object.
- Asteria is the codename of the Chapter 4 map in Fortnite Battle Royale. This continues the trend of each map being named after a Greek deity whose name starts with the letter "A" (Athena for Chapter 1, Apollo for Chapter 2, and Artemis for Chapter 3).

== See also ==
- Greek mythology
- Goddess
- List of goddesses
