= Ossa (mythology) =

Greek mythological figure

In Greek mythology, Ossa (Ancient Greek: Όσσα) or Assa was the mother of King Sithon of Thrace by the sea god Poseidon. Her son was notorious for killing the wooers of his daughter, Pallene. In some accounts, the war-god Ares and Anchiroe were called the parents of Sithon.
