= Astraeus (disambiguation) =

Astraeus is a Greek mythological figure.

Astraeus may also refer to:

- Astraeus Airlines
- Astraeus (beetle), a genus of insects in the family Buprestidae
- Astraeus (fungus), a genus of fungi in the family Diplocystaceae
- Astraeus (mythology), other figures in Greek mythology
- Astraeus (Pythagorean), a writer who is said to be a source of Porphyry of Tyre's Vita Pythagorae.
