= Alcippe =

Alcippe may refer to:

- Alcippe (bird), a genus of birds in the Pellorneidae (ground-babbler) family
- Alcippe (mythology) or Alkippê, the name of seven figures in Greek mythology

== See also ==
- Pseudoalcippe, a monotypic genus of bird
