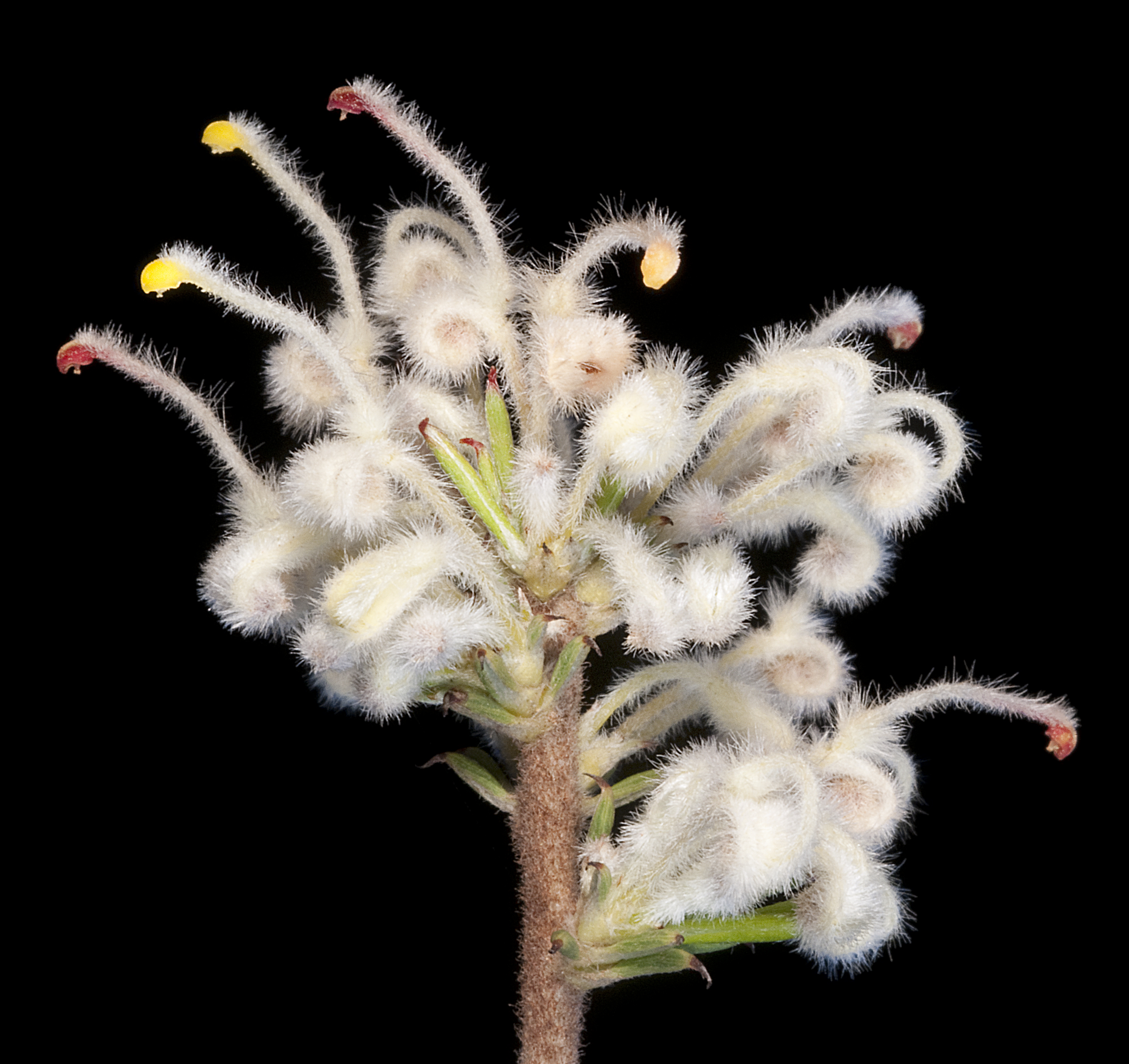

Scientific classification
- Kingdom: Plantae
- Clade: Tracheophytes
- Clade: Angiosperms
- Clade: Eudicots
- Order: Proteales
- Family: Proteaceae
- Genus: Grevillea
- Species: G. uncinulata

Binomial name
- Grevillea uncinulata Diels

Synonyms
- Grevillea oxystigma var. villosa Benth.; Grevillea uncinulata Diels subsp. uncinulata

= Grevillea uncinulata =

Hook-leaf grevillea

Species of shrub endemic to Western Australia

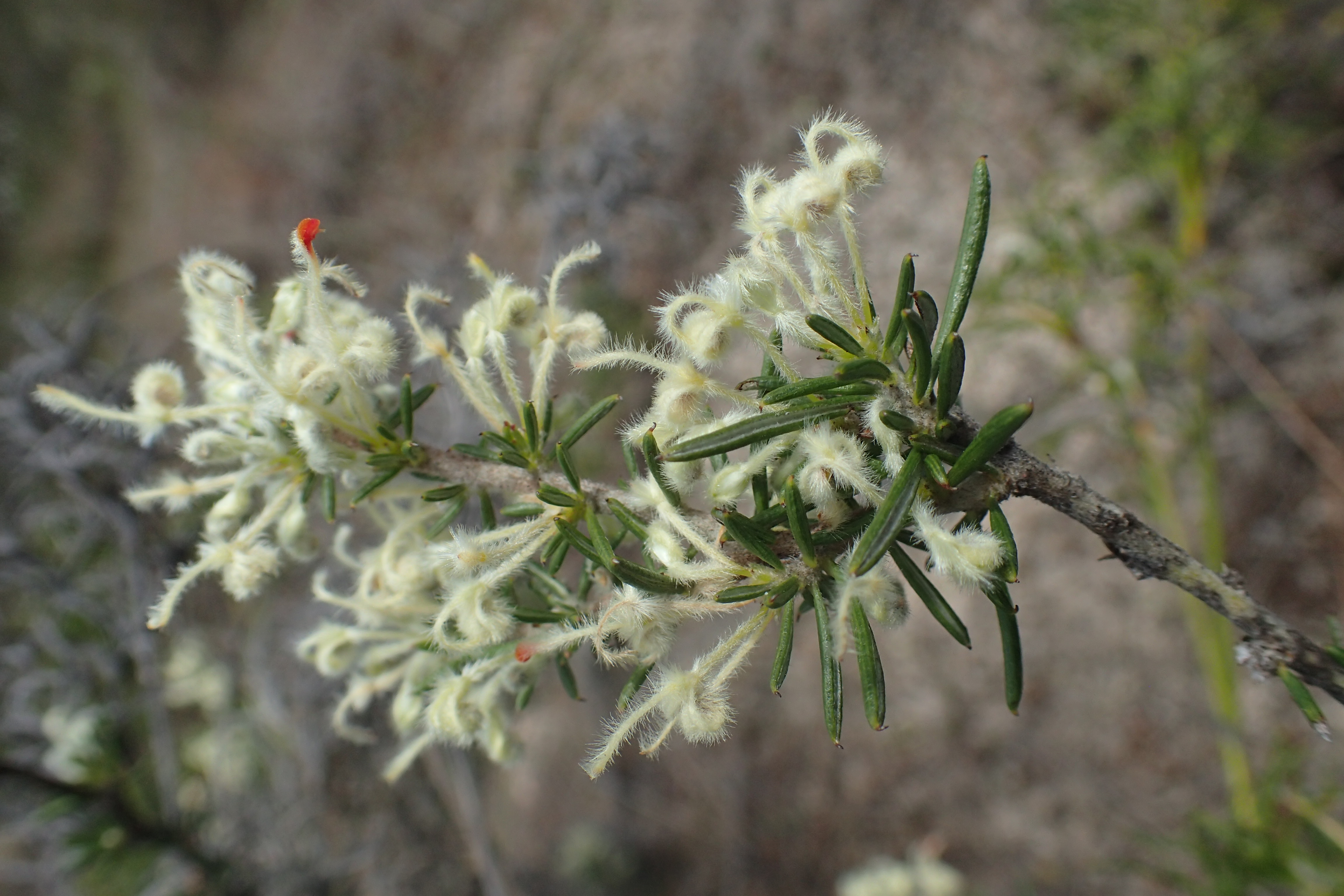
Leaves and flowers

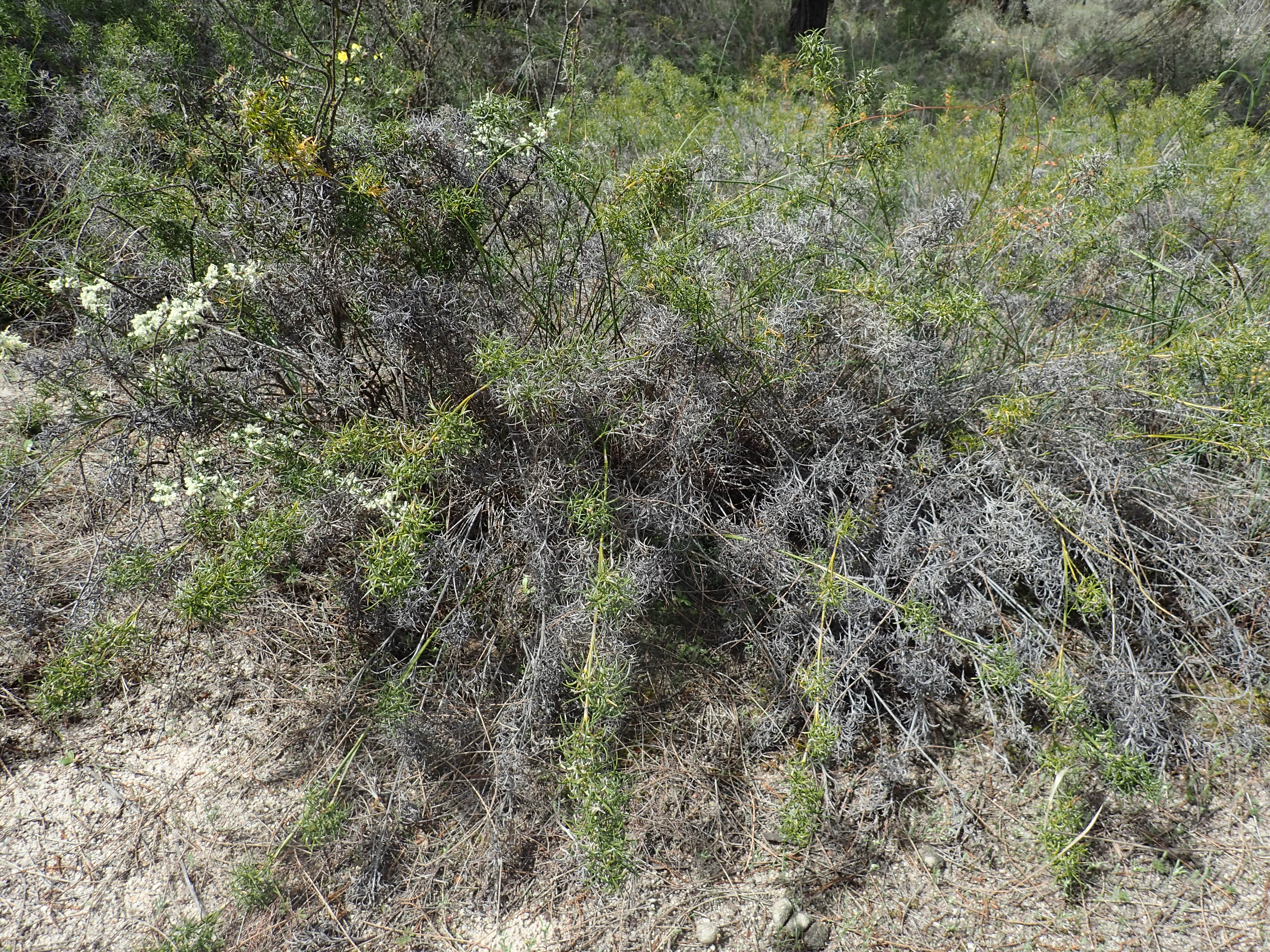
Habit in the Wallaby Hills Nature Reserve, near York

Grevillea uncinulata, also known as hook-leaf grevillea, is species of flowering plant in the family Proteaceae and is endemic to the south-west of Western Australia. It is an erect, open shrub with linear to elliptic leaves arranged in clusters along the branches, and small clusters of white flowers, the style with a yellow, orange or red tip.

== Description ==
Grevillea uncinulata is an erect, open shrub that typically grows to a height of 15–100 cm (5.9–39.4 in). It has linear to elliptic leaves 2–10 mm (0.079–0.394 in) long and 1–2.5 mm (0.039–0.098 in) wide arranged in clusters along the branches. The edges of the leaves are rolled under, concealing the lower surface apart from a longitudinal groove. The flowers are arranged in small clusters, the flowers near the far end of the rachis flowering first. The flowers are hairy and white with a yellow-, orange- or red-tipped style, the pistil 7–10 mm (0.28–0.39 in) long. Flowering occurs from May to November, and the fruit is a shaggy-hairy, oblong to elliptic follicle about 8 mm (0.31 in) long.

== Taxonomy ==
Grevillea uncinulata was first formally described in 1904 by Ludwig Diels in Botanische Jahrbücher für Systematik, Pflanzengeschichte und Pflanzengeographie from specimens collected near Tammin. The specific epithet (uncinulata) means "possessing little hooks", referring to the tip of the leaves.

== Distribution and habitat ==
This grevillea grows in heathy shrubland or shrubby woodland and is widespread from near Badgingarra to the Stirling Range and Ravensthorpe in the Avon Wheatbelt, Coolgardie, Esperance Plains, Geraldton Sandplains, Jarrah Forest, Mallee and Swan Coastal Plain bioregions of south-western Western Australia.

== Conservation status ==
Grevillea uncinulata is listed as "not threatened" by the Western Australian Government Department of Biodiversity, Conservation and Attractions.

== See also ==
- List of Grevillea species
