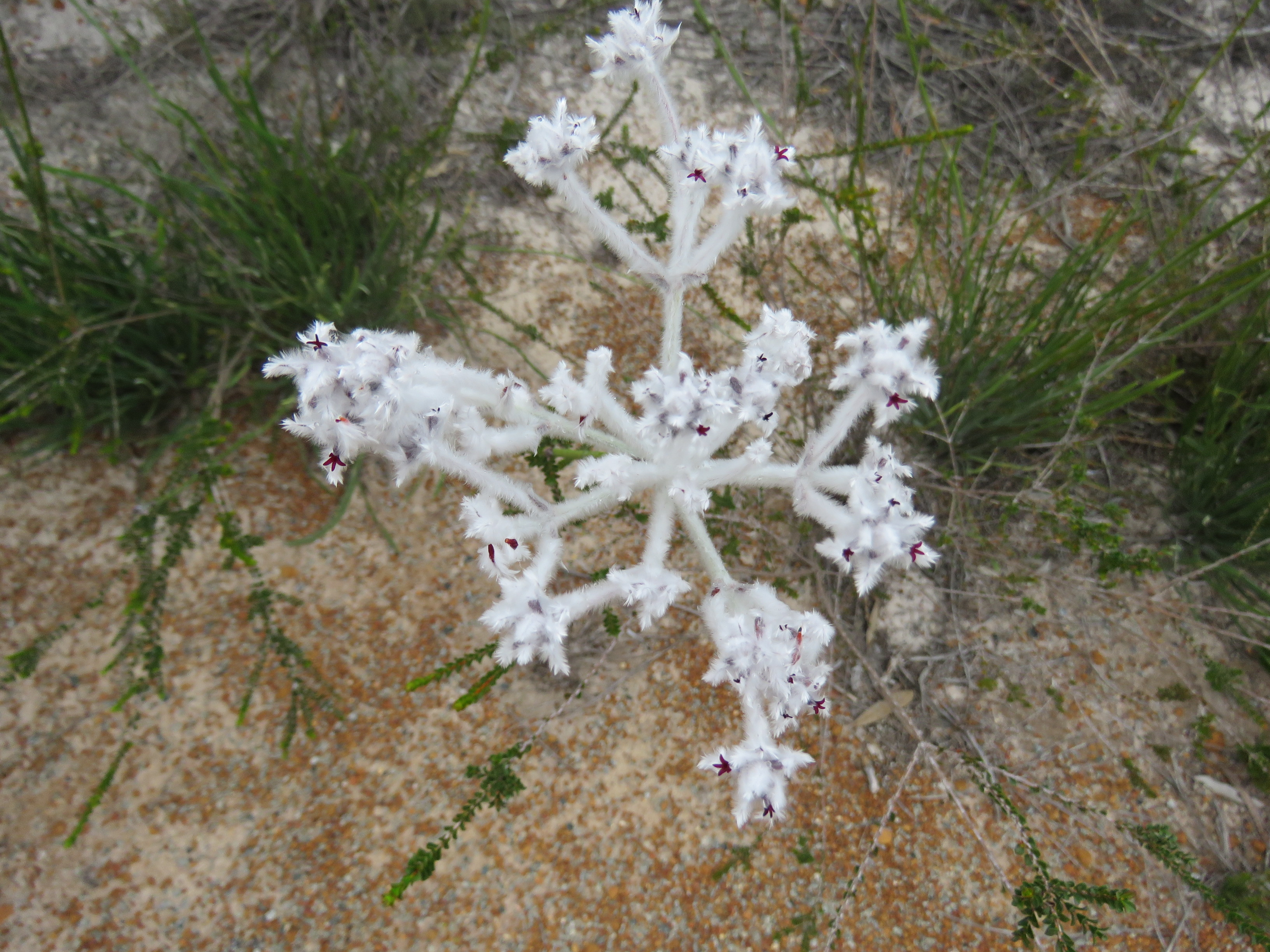
- In Lesueur National Park

Scientific classification
- Kingdom: Plantae
- Clade: Tracheophytes
- Clade: Angiosperms
- Clade: Eudicots
- Order: Proteales
- Family: Proteaceae
- Genus: Conospermum
- Species: C. incurvum

Binomial name
- Conospermum incurvum Lindl.

= Conospermum incurvum =

Plume smokebush

Species of Australian shrub

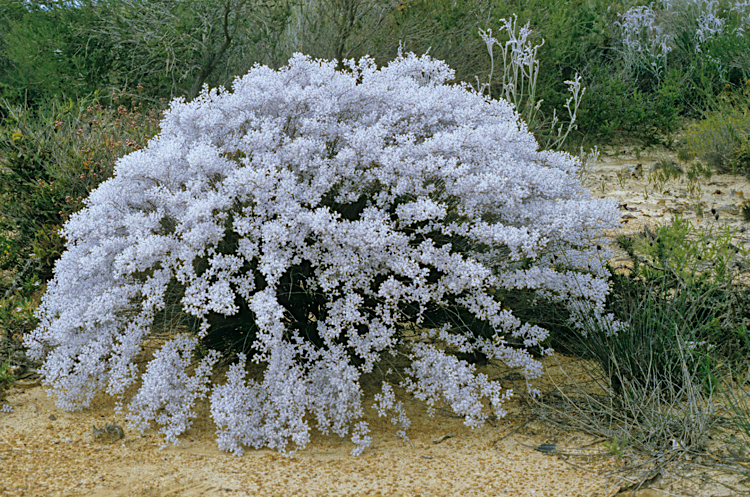
Habit in Badgingarra National Park

Conospermum incurvum, commonly known as plume smokebush, is a species of flowering plant in the family Proteaceae and is endemic to the south-west of Western Australia. It is an erect, spindly or prostrate shrub with densely arranged cylindrical leaves, and panicles of white, tube-shaped flowers with dark blue bracteoles.

== Description ==
Conospermum incurvum is a prostrate or erect, spindly shrub that typically grows to a height of 0.4–1 m (1 ft 4 in – 3 ft 3 in), its stems densely covered in cylindrical leaves, 7–30 mm (0.28–1.18 in) long and 0.5–0.8 mm (0.020–0.031 in) wide. The leaves are s-shaped and the edges are curved upwards. The flowers are arranged in woolly panicles 50–400 mm (2.0–15.7 in) long on the ends of branches. The flowers have many bracts and dark blue, d-shaped bracteoles 2.2–3.5 mm (0.087–0.138 in) long and 2–3 mm (0.079–0.118 in) wide. The perianth is tube-shaped, 4–7 mm (0.16–0.28 in) long, woolly and white.

== Taxonomy ==
Conospermum incurvum was first published in John Lindley's 1839 A Sketch of the Vegetation of the Swan River Colony, based on unspecified material. Its taxonomic history since that time has been entirely without incident, with neither synonyms nor infrageneric taxa being published. Its close relative is C. brachyphyllum, from which it may be distinguished by its more densely clustered leaves. The specific epithet (incurvum) means 'curved inwards', referring to the leaves.

== Distribution and habitat ==
Plume smokebush occurs in undulating sandplains of white, grey or yellow/brown sand over laterite, ranging from Eneabba south to Perth. Thus it primarily occurs in the Swan Coastal Plain and Geraldton Sandplains biogeographic regions. There are also some outlying populations in the Avon Wheatbelt and Jarrah Forest regions, and a single population in the Esperance Plains region north of Albany.

== Conservation status ==
This species of Conospermum is not considered threatened.

== Uses ==
Compounds from this plant are currently being investigated for medicinal use.
