= Leioproctus caesicitus =

Scientific classification
- Kingdom: Animalia
- Phylum: Arthropoda
- Clade: Pancrustacea
- Class: Insecta
- Order: Hymenoptera
- Family: Colletidae
- Genus: Leioproctus
- Species: L. caesicitus

Binomial name
- Leioproctus caesicitus Batley, 2025

Species of bee

Leioproctus caesicitus, or Leioproctus (Euryglossidia) caesicitus, is a species of bee in the family Colletidae and subfamily Colletinae. It is endemic to Australia. It was described by entomologist Michael Batley in 2025.

== Etymology ==
The specific epithet caesicitus (Latin: "blueish") refers to iridescence on the metasoma.

== Description ==
The female body length is about 6.5 mm. Integumental colouration is mainly black and dark brown, with some steel-blue iridescence on parts of the metasoma. The hair is mostly white.

== Distribution and habitat ==
The species occurs in south-west Western Australia. The type locality is Badgingarra National Park.

== Behaviour ==
The adults are flying mellivores.
