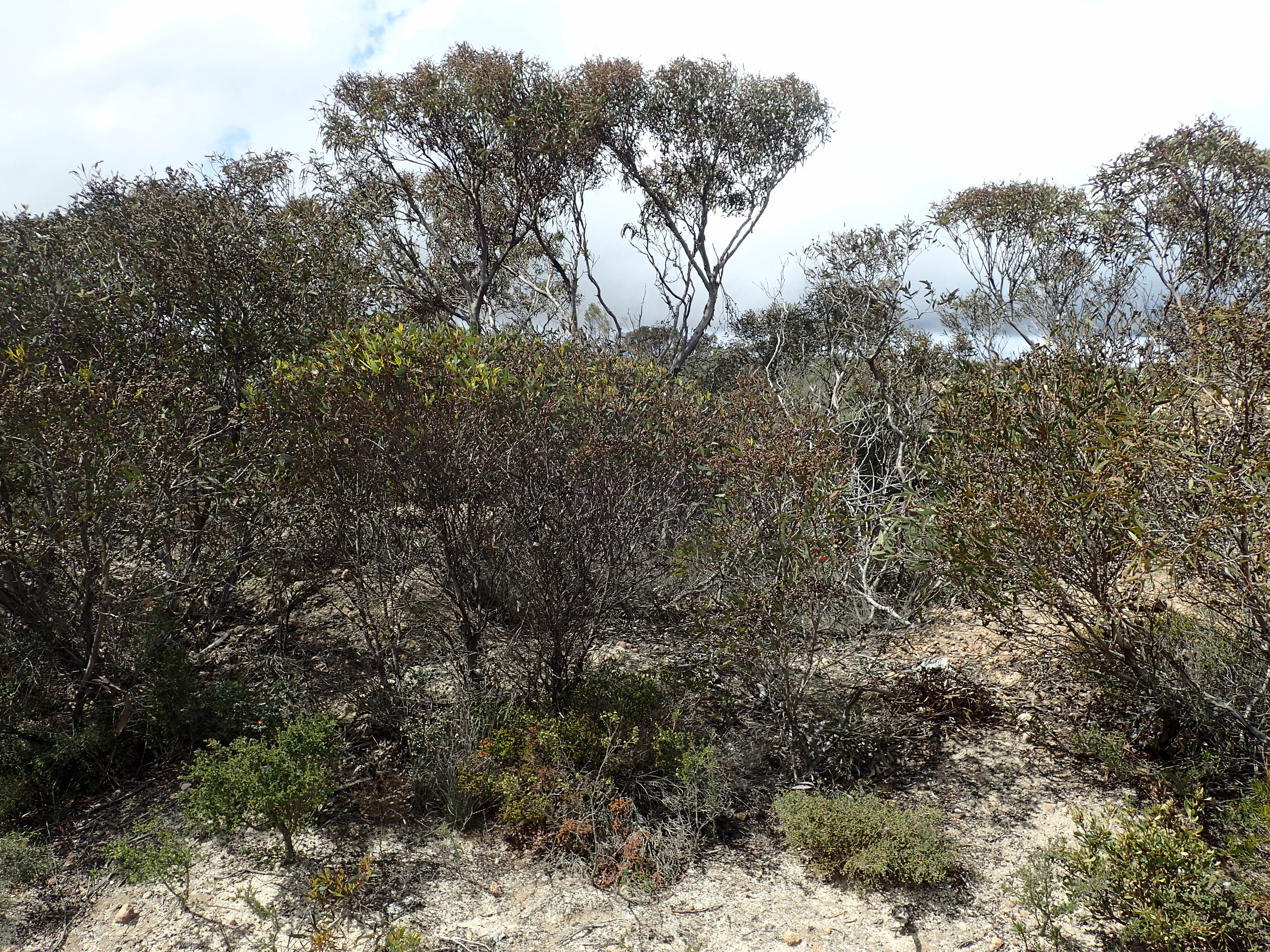
- Near the Fitzgerald River National Park

Conservation status
- Endangered (IUCN 3.1)

Scientific classification
- Kingdom: Plantae
- Clade: Tracheophytes
- Clade: Angiosperms
- Clade: Eudicots
- Clade: Rosids
- Order: Myrtales
- Family: Myrtaceae
- Genus: Eucalyptus
- Species: E. dissimulata

Binomial name
- Eucalyptus dissimulata Brooker

= Eucalyptus dissimulata =

Red-capped mallee

Species of eucalyptus

Eucalyptus dissimulata, commonly known as the red-capped mallee, is a species of mallee that is endemic to Western Australia. It has smooth greyish bark that is shed in strips, glossy green, narrow elliptic to narrow lance-shaped adult leaves, flower buds in groups of between seven and eleven, creamy white flowers and short cylindrical to stubby barrel-shaped fruit.

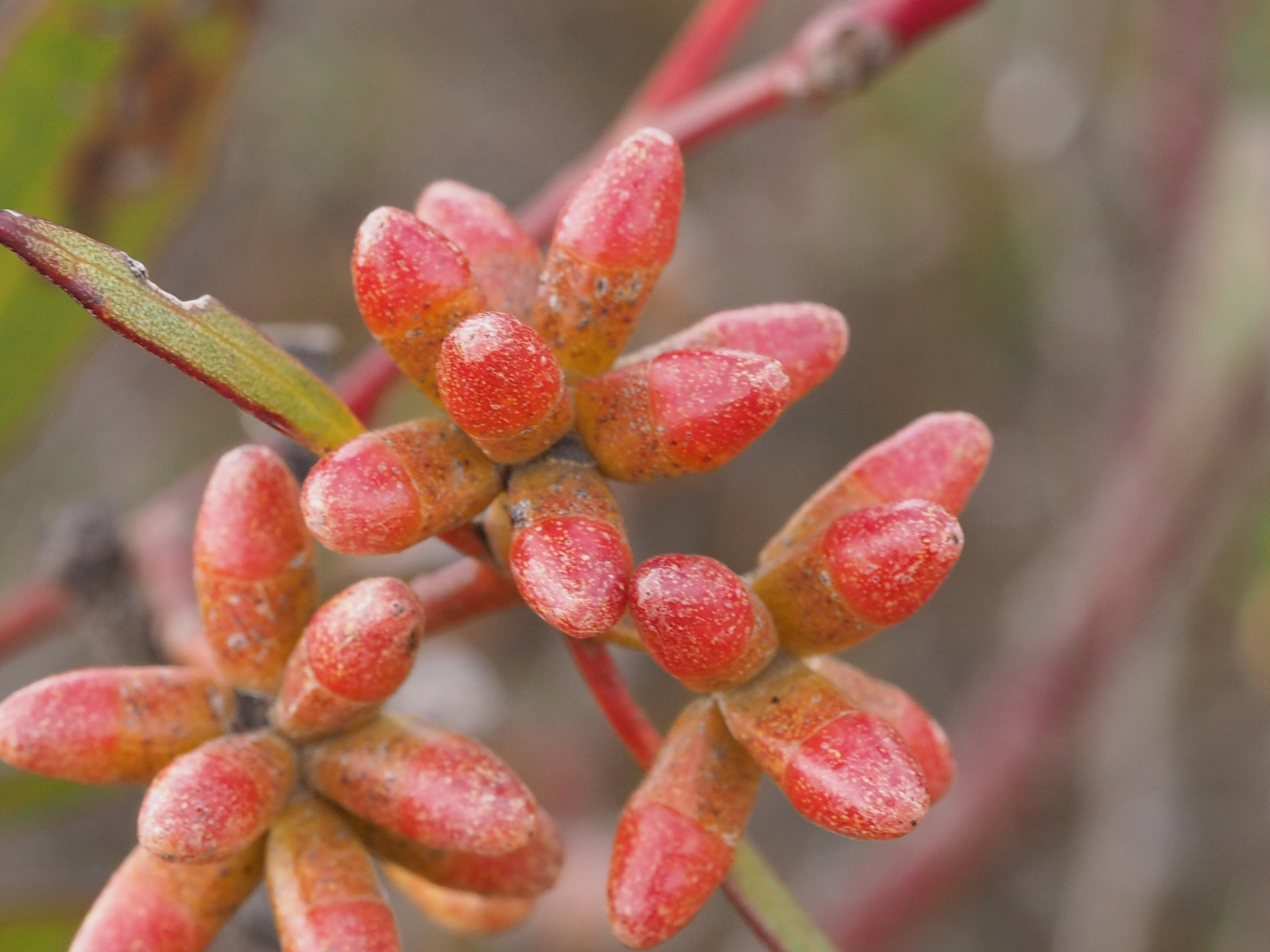
Flower buds

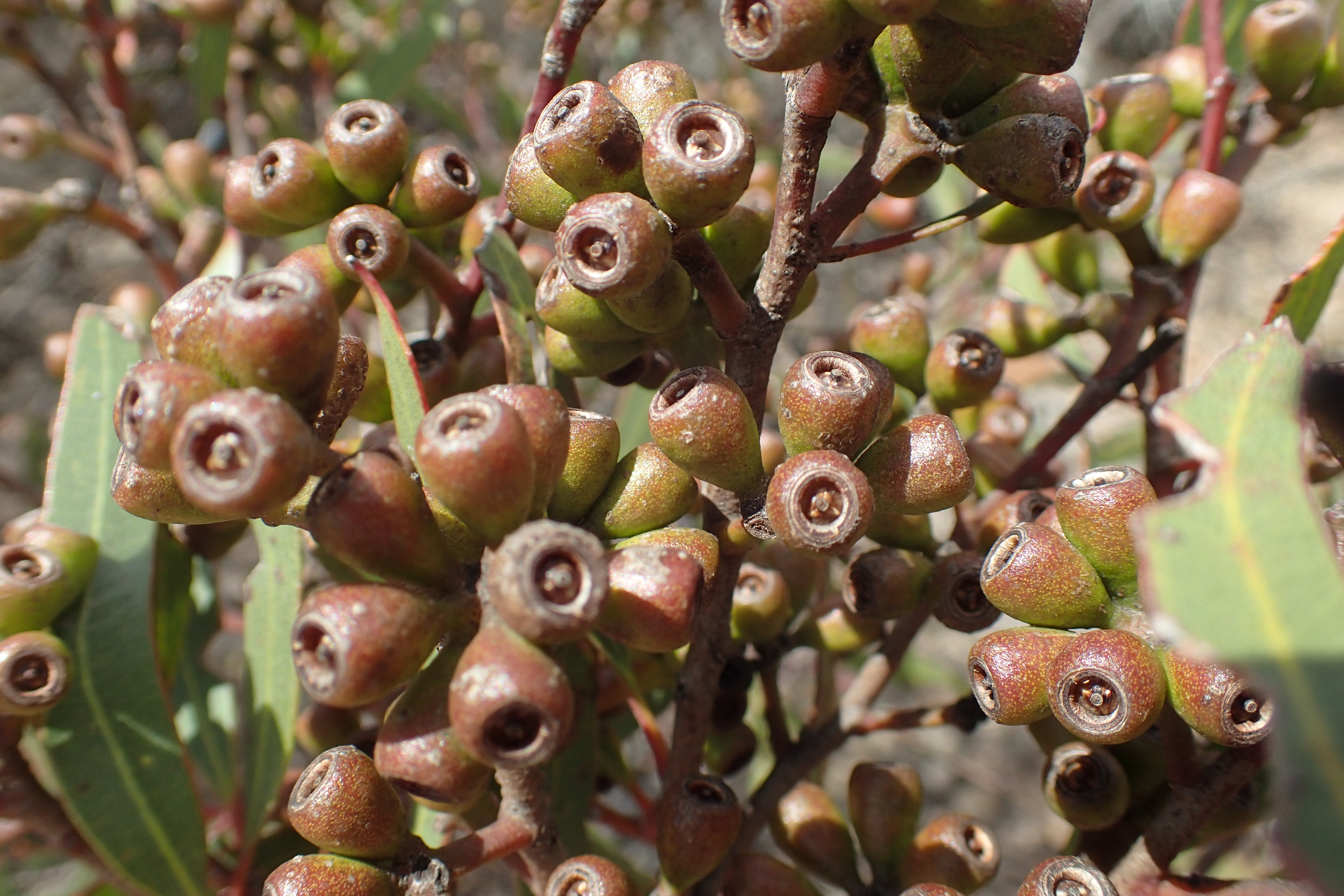
Fruit

== Description ==
Eucalyptus dissimulata is a mallee that typically grows to a height of 1–6 m (3 ft 3 in – 19 ft 8 in) and forms a lignotuber. It has smooth light grey to greenish brown bark that is shed in strips. Young plants and coppice regrowth have sessile leaves arranged in opposite pairs and 25–45 mm (0.98–1.77 in) long and 10–15 mm (0.39–0.59 in) wide. Adult leaves are glossy green, arranged alternately, narrow elliptic to narrow lance-shaped, 45–95 mm (1.8–3.7 in) long and 5–17 mm (0.20–0.67 in) wide on a petiole 5–18 mm (0.20–0.71 in) long. The flower buds are arranged in leaf axils in groups of seven, nine or eleven, the groups on an unbranched peduncle 5–20 mm (0.20–0.79 in) long, the individual buds on a pedicel 1–5 mm (0.039–0.197 in) long. Mature buds are oval to diamond shaped, 7–12 mm (0.28–0.47 in) long and 4–5 mm (0.16–0.20 in) wide with a conical operculum 3–5 mm (0.12–0.20 in) long. Flowering occurs between October and March and the flowers are creamy white. The fruit is a woody, shortly cylindrical or stubby barrel-shaped capsule 5–7 mm (0.20–0.28 in) long and 5–8 mm (0.20–0.31 in) wide with the valves enclosed below the rim. The seeds are brown-grey and a flattened oval shape.

== Taxonomy and naming ==
Eucalyptus dissimulata was first formally described by the botanist Ian Brooker in 1988 in the journal Nuytsia from a specimen he collected in 1984 about 30 km (19 mi) north of Needilup. The specific epithet (dissimulata) is a Latin word meaning "pretending", referring to the superficial similarity of this species to E. albida.

This species is part of the Eucalyptus subgenus Symphyomyrtus in the section Bisectae and the subsection Destitutae.

== Distribution and habitat ==
Red-capped mallee is found on sand-plains and near creeks, along a narrow, near-coastal strip in the Wheatbelt and Goldfields-Esperance regions between Corrigin and Munglinup where it grows in sandy-loamy soils.

== Conservation status ==
Eucalyptus dissimulata is classified as "not threatened" by the Western Australian Government Department of Parks and Wildlife.

== See also ==
- List of Eucalyptus species
