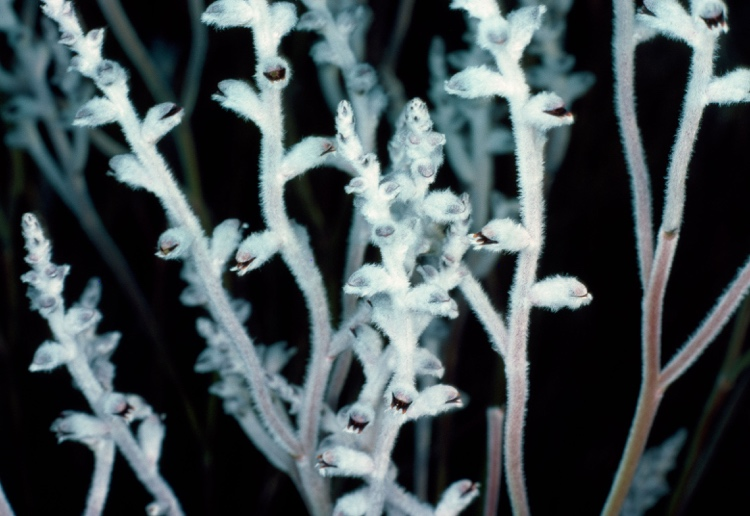

Scientific classification
- Kingdom: Plantae
- Clade: Tracheophytes
- Clade: Angiosperms
- Clade: Eudicots
- Order: Proteales
- Family: Proteaceae
- Genus: Conospermum
- Species: C. canaliculatum

Binomial name
- Conospermum canaliculatum Meisn.

= Conospermum canaliculatum =

Species of shrub native to Australia

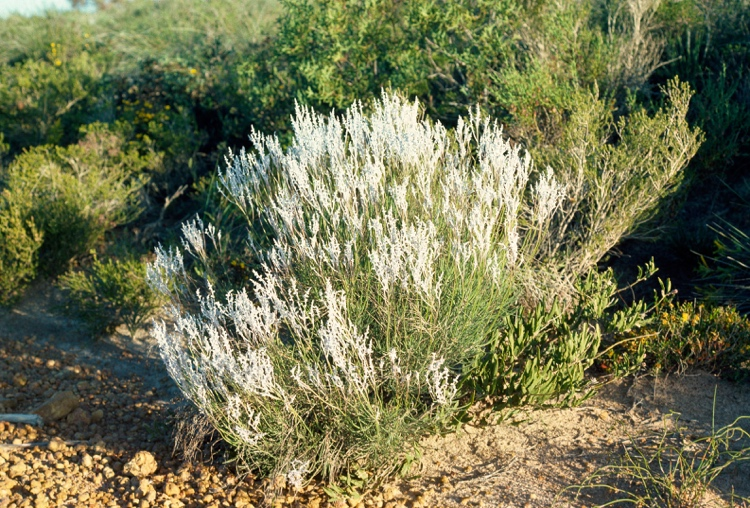
Habit near Badgingarra

Conospermum canaliculatum is a species of flowering plant in the family Proteaceae, and is endemic to the south-west of Western Australia. It is a dense, multistemmed, erect shrub with linear leaves and spike-like panicles of woolly white, tube-shaped flowers.

== Description ==
Conospermum canaliculatum is a dense, multistemmed, erect shrub that typically grows to a height of up to 1 m (3 ft 3 in). Its leaves are linear, 40–200 mm (1.6–7.9 in) long and 2–4 mm (0.079–0.157 in) wide with distinct longitudinal channels on the upper surface. The flowers are arranged in branched, spike-like panicles in upper leaf axils on hairy peduncles 105–150 mm (4.1–5.9 in) long. The bracteoles are 1.5–2.5 mm (0.059–0.098 in) long. The perianth is white-woolly and black or maroon inside, forming a tube 3.0–3.5 mm (0.12–0.14 in) long. The upper lip is 1.0–1.6 mm (0.039–0.063 in) long, the lower lip joined for 0.5–1.0 mm (0.020–0.039 in) long with lobes 0.75–1.0 mm (0.030–0.039 in) long and 0.2–0.3 mm (0.0079–0.0118 in) wide. Flowering time varies with subspecies and the fruit is a hairy, rusty-brown nut 2.0–2.5 mm (0.079–0.098 in) long.

== Taxonomy ==
Conospermum canaliculatum was first formally described in 1848 by Carl Meissner in Johann Georg Christian Lehmann's book, Plantae Preissianae from specimens collected in the Swan River Colony by James Drummond.

In 1995, Eleanor Marion Bennett described subspecies apiculatum in the Flora of Australia, and that name, and that of the autonym are accepted by the Australian Plant Census:

- Conospermum canaliculatum subsp. apiculatum E.M.Benn. has hairy grey leaves 40–75 mm (1.6–3.0 in) long, and flowers from September to December.
- Conospermum canaliculatum Meisn. subsp. canaliculatum has glabrous leaves 130–200 mm (5.1–7.9 in) long, and flowers from September to November.

== Distribution and habitat ==
This species grows in sand between Perth and Badgingarra. Subspecies apiculatum is found near Badgingarra in the Geraldton Sandplains bioregion and subsp. canaliculatum occurs between Perth and Yanchep in the Avon Wheatbelt, Geraldton Sandplains, Jarrah Forest and Swan Coastal Plain bioregions.

== Conservation status ==
Both subspecies of C. canaliculatum are listed as "not threatened" by the Government of Western Australia Department of Parks and Wildlife.
