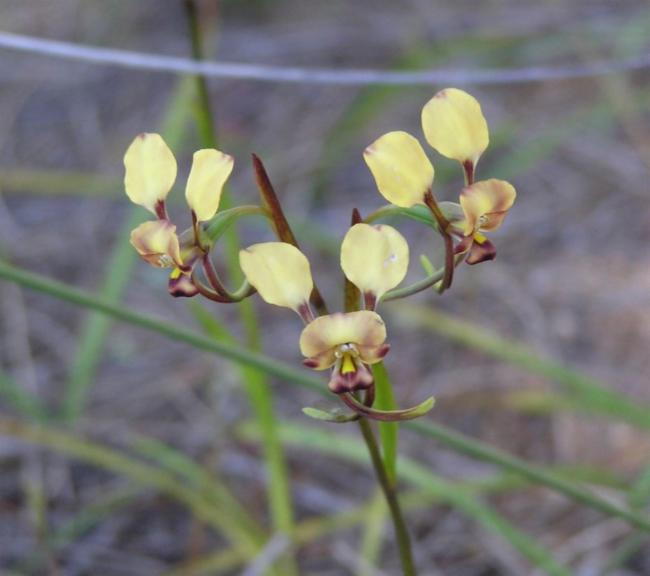

Conservation status
- Priority Four — Rare Taxa (DEC)

Scientific classification
- Kingdom: Plantae
- Clade: Embryophytes
- Clade: Tracheophytes
- Clade: Angiosperms
- Clade: Monocots
- Order: Asparagales
- Family: Orchidaceae
- Subfamily: Orchidoideae
- Tribe: Diurideae
- Genus: Diuris
- Species: D. recurva

Binomial name
- Diuris recurva D.L.Jones

= Diuris recurva =

Mini donkey orchid

Species of orchid

Diuris recurva, commonly called mini donkey orchid is a species of orchid that is endemic to the south-west of Western Australia. It has one or two leaves at its base, up to six small pale yellow and brownish flowers and grows in winter-wet places between Badgingarra and Kalbarri.

== Description ==
Diuris recurva is a tuberous, perennial herb with one or two linear leaves that are 100–150 mm (4–6 in) long, about 5 mm (0.2 in) wide and folded lengthwise. Up to six pale yellow flowers with brownish to dark burgundy-coloured markings, 16–20 mm (0.6–0.8 in) long and 12–16 mm (0.5–0.6 in) wide are borne on a flowering stem 200–300 mm (8–10 in) tall. The dorsal sepal curves upwards, often backwards and is egg-shaped with the narrower end towards the base, about 8 mm (0.3 in) long and 7 mm (0.3 in) wide. The lateral sepals are linear to lance-shaped, green or reddish, 9–12.5 mm (0.4–0.5 in) long, about 2 mm (0.08 in) wide, turned downwards and usually crossed over each other. The petals are more or less erect with an egg-shaped blade 10–13 mm (0.4–0.5 in) long and 4–6.5 mm (0.16–0.26 in) wide on a greenish-brown stalk 4–6 mm (0.16–0.24 in) long. The labellum is 4–5 mm (0.16–0.20 in) long and has three lobes. The centre lobe is spatula-shaped, 3–4.5 mm (0.1–0.2 in) wide and dark reddish brown with yellow patches. The side lobes are 4–5 mm (0.16–0.20 in) long and 3 mm (0.1 in) wide and curve backwards. There is a single raised, ridge-like callus along the mid-line of the labellum. Flowering occurs in July and August.

== Taxonomy and naming ==
Diuris recurva was first formally described in 1991 by David Jones from a specimen collected near Northampton, and the description was published in Australian Orchid Review. The specific epithet (recurva) is a Latin word meaning "recurved", referring to the petals and lateral sepals that are curved backwards.

== Distribution and habitat ==
Mini donkey orchid grows mostly in winter-wet heath between Badgingarra and Kalbarri in the Avon Wheatbelt, Geraldton Sandplains and Jarrah Forest biogeographic regions.

== Conservation ==
Diuris recurva is classified as "Priority Four" by the Government of Western Australia Department of Parks and Wildlife, meaning that is rare or near threatened.
