= Methone (mythology) =

In Greek mythology, Methone (Ancient Greek: Μεθώνη, romanized: Methṓnē) was the name shared by four women:

- Methone, one of the Alcyonides, daughters of the giant Alcyoneus. She was the sister of Alkippe, Anthe, Asteria, Drimo, Pallene and Phthonia (Phosthonia or Chthonia). When their father Alcyoneus was slain by Heracles, these girls threw themselves into the sea from Kanastraion, which is the peak of Pellene. They were then transformed into halcyons (kingfishers) by the goddess Amphitrite.
- Methone, the nymph-consort of Pierus, king of Pieria, and by the latter, became the mother of Oeagrus, father of Orpheus. In some accounts rather, she was called the sister of Pierus.
- Methone or Mothone (Μοθώνη), a bastard daughter of King Oeneus of Calydon by a concubine. She was the eponymous heroine who gave her name to Methone in Messenia.
- Methone, wife of King Poeas of Meliboea and mother of Philoctetes. Otherwise, the latter's mother was called Demonassa. This Methone may be the same as the above character.
