= Alcippe (mythology) =

Mythological Greek characters

Alcippe (/ˌælˈsɪpiː/; Ancient Greek: Ἀλκίππη, romanized: Alkippē, lit. 'strength of the horse' or 'mighty mare') was a name attributed to a number of figures in Greek mythology.

- Alcippe, daughter of Ares, the god of war, and the mortal princess Aglaurus.
- Alcippe, one of the Alcyonides, daughters of the giant Alcyoneus. She was the sister of Anthe, Asteria, Drimo, Methone, Pallene and Phthonia (Phosthonia or Chthonia). When their father Alcyoneus was slain by Heracles, these girls threw themselves into the sea from Kanastraion, which is the peak of Pellene. They were then transformed into halcyons (kingfishers) by the goddess Amphitrite.
- Alcippe, Mysian daughter of Poseidon and sister of Astraeus. She was mistakenly deflowered by her brother who after realizing what he had done, flung himself into the river Adurus which bore his name (Astraeus) after the incident. The river was later on called Caicus, from the son of Hermes and Ocyrrhoe.
- Alcippe, mother of Daedalus by Eupalamus, son of Metion.
- Alcippe, the daughter of King Oenomaus in the Parallel Lives of Plutarch, who cites a historian named Dositheus for this information. She married Evenus, the son of Ares and Sterope, by whom she bore a daughter, Marpessa.
- Alcippe, one of the attendants of Helen.
- Alcippe, an Amazon who vowed to remain a virgin. She was killed by Heracles during his ninth labor.
- In Pliny the Elder's Natural History, a woman named Alcippe was said to have given birth to an elephant. According to Johannes Toepffer, this is probably the same figure as Glaucippe.
