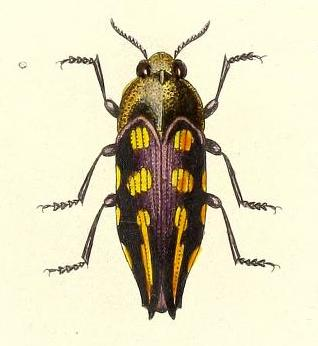

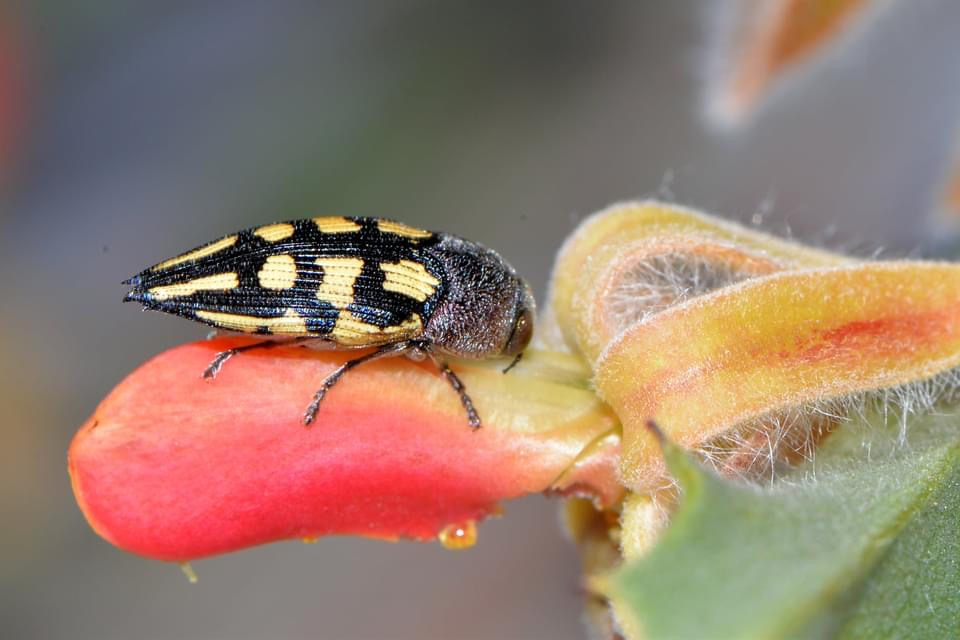
- on Jacksonia anthoclada

Scientific classification
- Domain: Eukaryota
- Kingdom: Animalia
- Phylum: Arthropoda
- Class: Insecta
- Order: Coleoptera
- Suborder: Polyphaga
- Infraorder: Elateriformia
- Family: Buprestidae
- Genus: Astraeus
- Species: A. flavopictus

Binomial name
- Astraeus flavopictus Gory & Laporte, 1837

= Astraeus flavopictus =

Species of beetle

Astraeus flavopictus is a species of beetle in the jewel beetle family, Buprestidae, found in Australia.

It was first described by Hippolyte Louis Gory and Francis de Laporte de Castelnau in 1837 from a specimen taken from the Swan River.

Adult beetles are associated with Jacksonia species.
