= Drymo =

Two characters in Greek mythology

In Greek mythology, Drymo or Drimo (Ancient Greek: Δριμὼ) may refer to two different characters:

- Drymo or Drimo, was one of the 50 Nereids, sea-nymph daughters of the 'Old Man of the Sea' Nereus and the Oceanid Doris. She was one of the nymphs in the train of Cyrene. Drymo was described to have bright, waving locks of hair and a slender pale neck.
- Drimo, one of the Alcyonides, daughters of the giant Alcyoneus. She was the sister of Alcippe, Anthe, Asteria, Methone, Pallene and Phthonia (Phosthonia or Chthonia). When their father Alcyoneus was slain by Heracles, these girls threw themselves into the sea from Kanastraion, which is the peak of Pellene. They were then transformed into halcyons (kingfishers) by the goddess Amphitrite.
