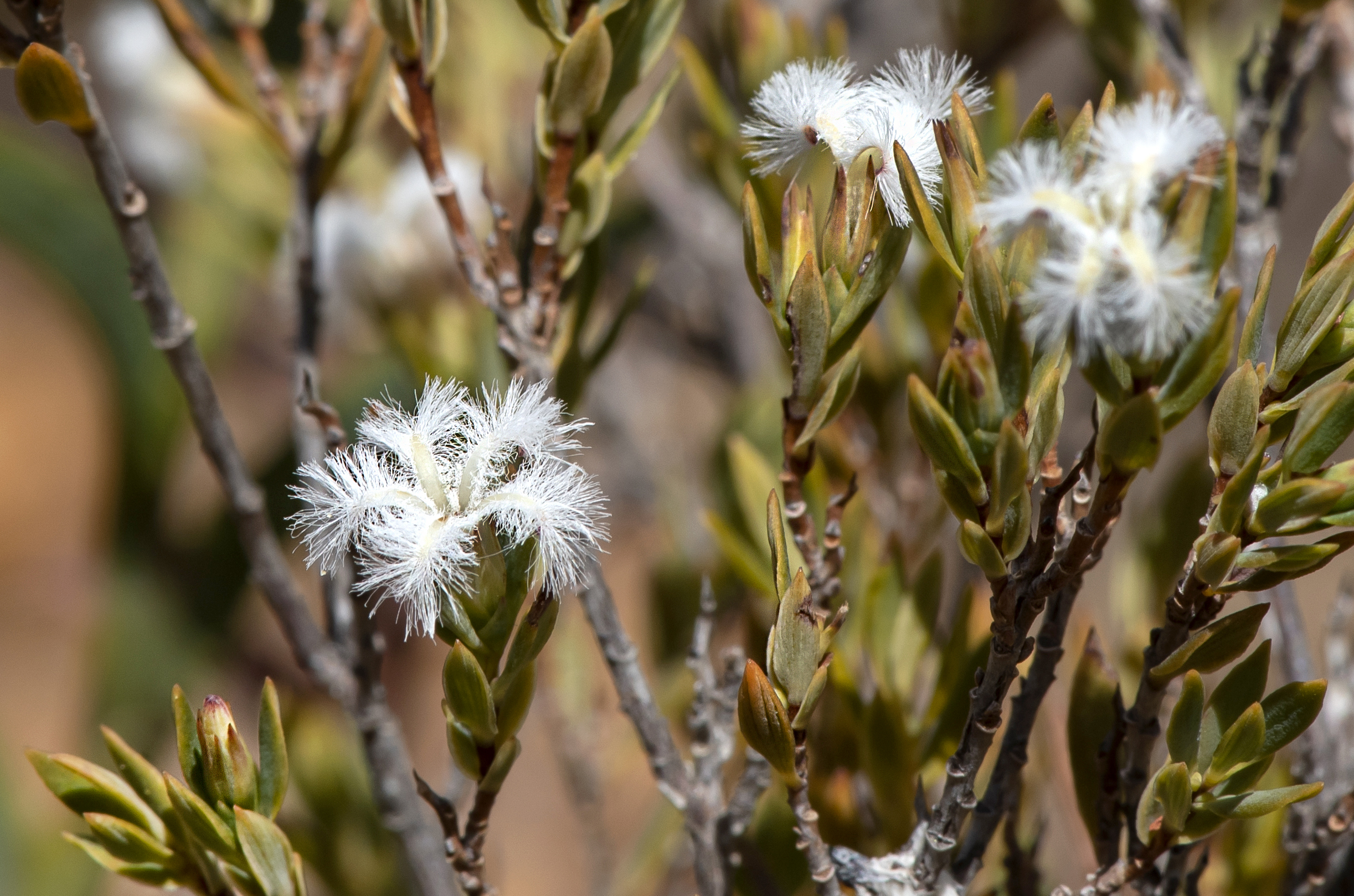

Conservation status
- Priority Three — Poorly Known Taxa (DEC)

Scientific classification
- Kingdom: Plantae
- Clade: Tracheophytes
- Clade: Angiosperms
- Clade: Eudicots
- Clade: Asterids
- Order: Ericales
- Family: Ericaceae
- Genus: Leucopogon
- Species: L. foliosus

Binomial name
- Leucopogon foliosus Hislop
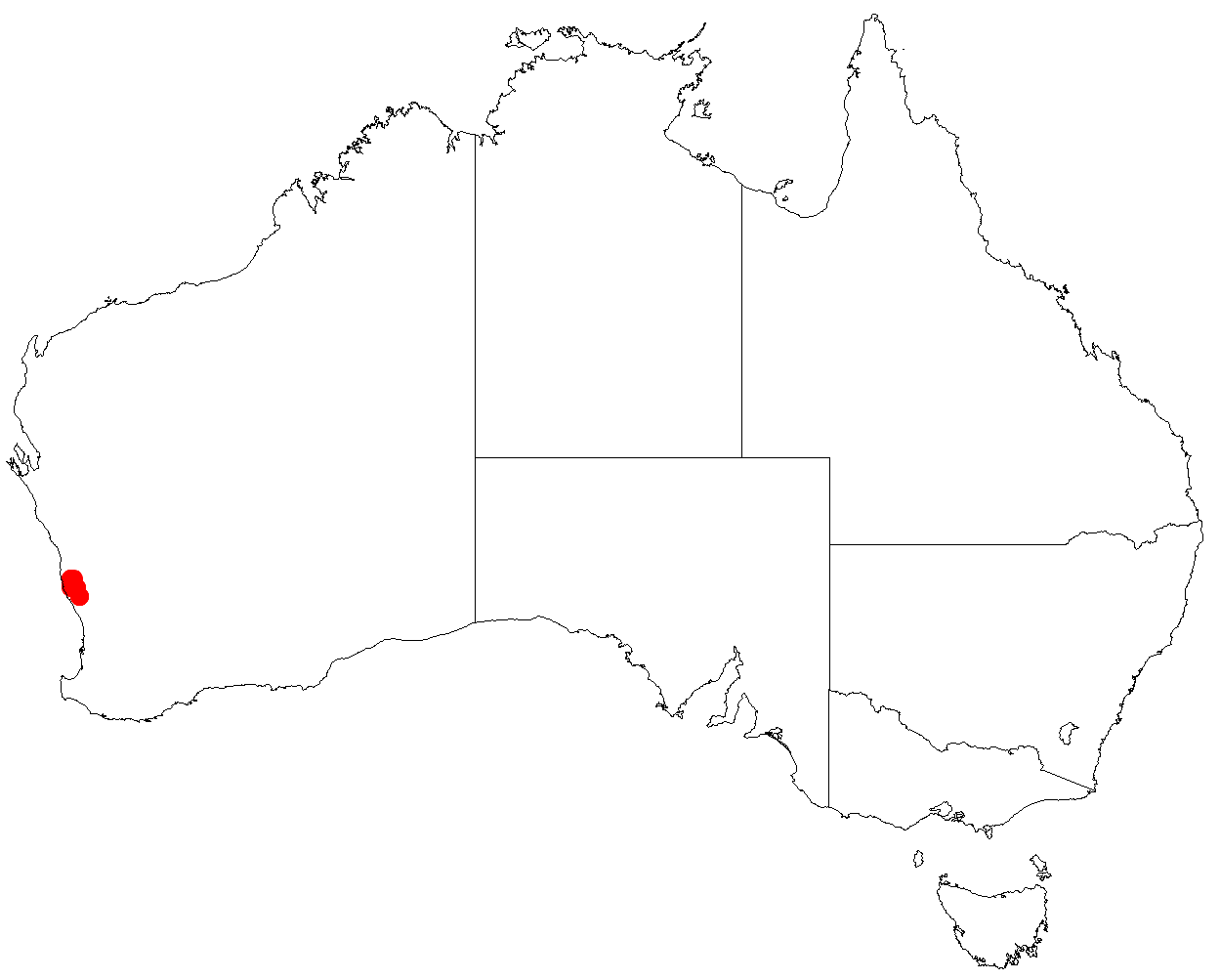
- Occurrence data from AVH

= Leucopogon foliosus =

Species of flowering plant

Leucopogon foliosus is a species of flowering plant in the heath family Ericaceae and is endemic to the south-west of Western Australia. It is a low, spreading shrub with hairy young branchlets, spirally arranged, erect, linear, narrowly egg-shaped to narrowly elliptic leaves, and white, narrowly bell-shaped flowers.

== Description ==
Leucopogon foliosus is a spreading shrub that typically grows up to about 40 cm (16 in) high and wide, usually with a single stem at the base, its young branchlets covered with short hairs. The leaves are spirally arranged and point upwards, linear to narrowly egg-shaped or narrowly elliptic, 5–11 mm (0.20–0.43 in) long and 0.8–1.8 mm (0.031–0.071 in) wide on a petiole 0.4–0.8 mm (0.016–0.031 in) long. The flowers are arranged in groups of 3 to 8, 3–6 mm (0.12–0.24 in) long mostly on the ends of branches, with leaf-like bracts and egg-shaped bracteoles 1.7–2.7 mm (0.067–0.106 in) long and 1.0–1.2 mm (0.039–0.047 in) wide. The sepals are narrowly egg-shaped, 3.2–5.0 mm (0.13–0.20 in) long and sometimes tinged with purple near the tip, the petals white and joined at the base to form a narrowly bell-shaped tube 1.8–2.8 mm (0.071–0.110 in) long, the lobes 3.2–3.8 mm (0.13–0.15 in) long and often tinged with pink. Flowering mainly occurs from October to December and the fruit is a narrowly elliptic drupe 2.6–2.8 mm (0.10–0.11 in) long.

== Taxonomy ==
Leucopogon foliosus was first formally described in 2016 by Michael Hislop in the journal Nuytsia from specimens he collected in Badgingarra National Park in 2004. The specific epithet (foliosus) means "leafy", "many-leaved", referring to the leafy inflorescence of this species.

== Distribution and habitat ==
This leucopogon grows in heath between Mount Lesueur and a little south of Cataby in the Geraldton Sandplains bioregion of south-western Western Australia.

== Conservation status ==
Leucopogon foliosus is listed as "Priority Three" by the Government of Western Australia Department of Biodiversity, Conservation and Attractions, meaning that it is poorly known and known from only a few locations but is not under imminent threat.
