= Alcyonides =

Figures in Greek mythology

The Alcyonides (Ancient Greek: Ἀλκυονίδες, romanized: Alkyonides) were, in Greek mythology, the seven daughters of the giant Alcyoneus.

== Names ==
These sisters were identified individually as, Alkippe, Anthe, Asteria, Drimo, Methone, Pallene and Phthonia (Φθονία), also called Phosthonia or Chthonia.

== Mythology ==
When their father Alcyoneus was slain by Heracles, the Alcyonides threw themselves into the sea from Kanastraion, which is the peak of Pellene. They were transformed into halcyons (kingfishers) by Amphitrite.

== Legacy ==
=== Islands ===
The Alkyonides Islands are also small rocky islands in the Corinthian Gulf very close to the coast of Attica, Peloponnese and Central Greece, taking their name from the mythological figures. They reported a 2001 census population of nine inhabitants and are administratively part of the municipality of Loutraki-Perachora in Corinthia.

=== Climate ===
The term Alkyonides also refers to a meteorological phenomenon of the central Greek climate. Nearly every year in the period after Christmas until the middle of January there is a non-interrupted period of days with clear blue skies and warm temperatures, which at least in the Athens region can reach more than 20 °C over the day.

=== Astronomy ===
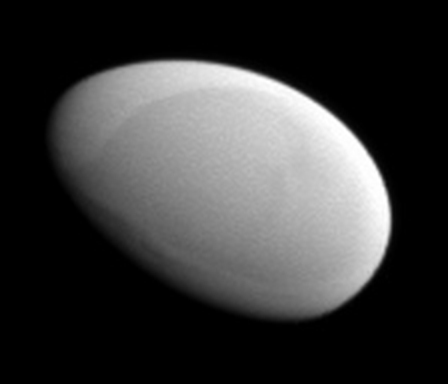
Methone (Saturn XXXII)

The Saturnian moons Methone, Anthe and Pallene are named after three of the Alkyonides.
