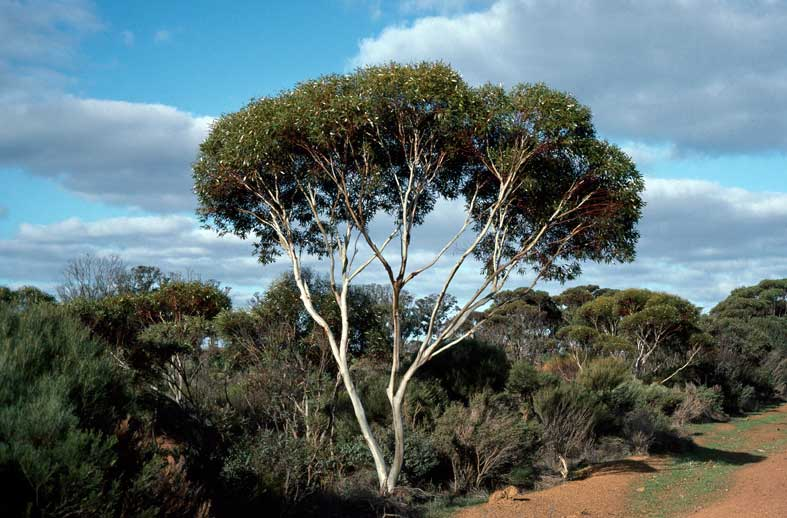
- Eucalyptus albida at Lake Grace

Conservation status
- Vulnerable (IUCN 3.1)

Scientific classification
- Kingdom: Plantae
- Clade: Tracheophytes
- Clade: Angiosperms
- Clade: Eudicots
- Clade: Rosids
- Order: Myrtales
- Family: Myrtaceae
- Genus: Eucalyptus
- Species: E. albida

Binomial name
- Eucalyptus albida Maiden & Blakely

= Eucalyptus albida =

White-leaved mallee

Species of eucalyptus

Eucalyptus albida, commonly known as the white-leaved mallee, is a mallee that is endemic to the south-west of Western Australia. It has smooth white or greyish brown bark, lance shaped adult leaves, and flowers in groups of between seven and eleven. The flowers are creamy white and the fruit are hemispherical to cone-shaped. The juvenile leaves that are often retained on mature plants are arranged in opposite pairs, egg-shaped to heart-shaped and bluish grey.

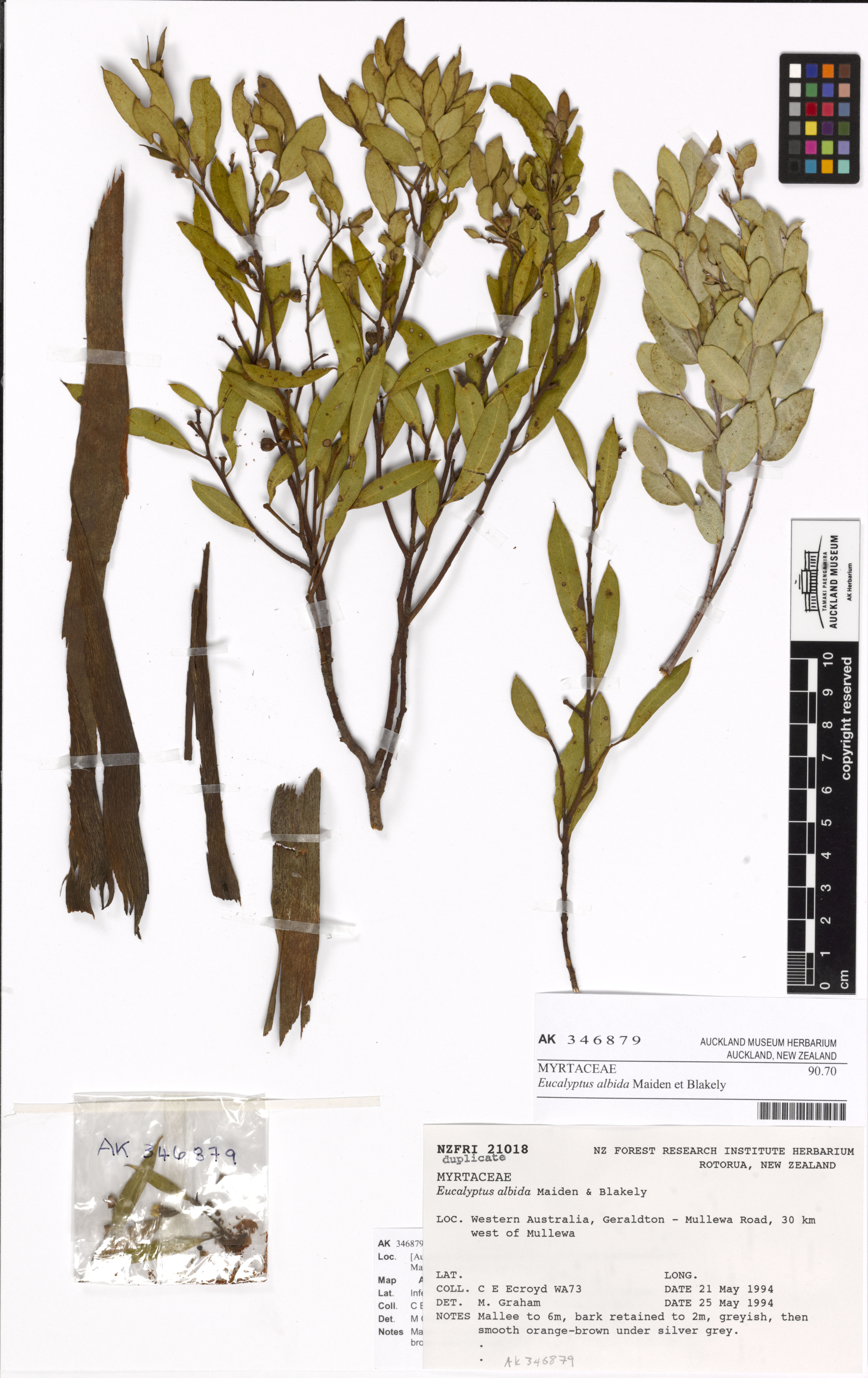
Hebarium specimen of E. albida

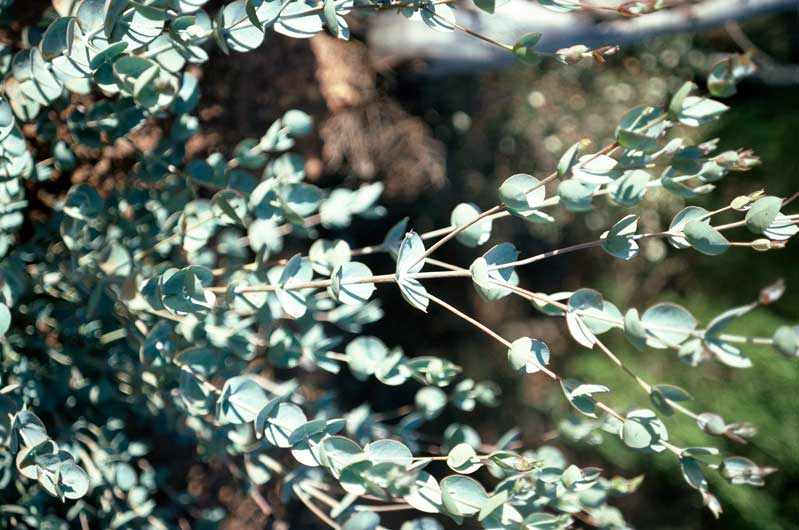
Juvenile foliage of E. albida

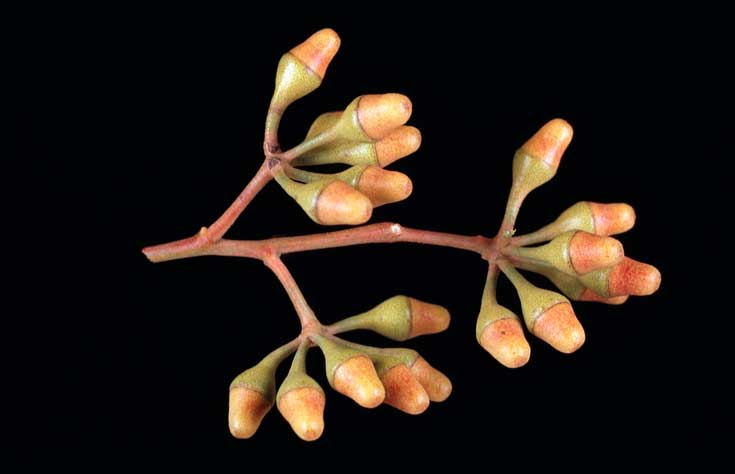
Flower buds of E. albida

== Description ==
Eucalyptus albida is a mallee that typically grows to a height of 1.5 to 4 metres (5 to 10 ft) and has smooth white or greyish brown bark. The leaves on young plants are arranged in opposite pairs, egg-shaped to heart-shaped, the same shade of bluish grey on both sides, 15–40 mm (0.6–2 in) long and 13–35 mm (0.5–1 in) wide. Juvenile leaves are often present on mature plants. The adult leaves are lance-shaped, glossy dark green on both sides, 40–70 mm (2–3 in) long and 5–15 mm (0.2–0.6 in) wide.

The flower buds are arranged on a branching inflorescence, each branch with groups of between seven and eleven buds on a peduncle 5–15 mm (0.2–0.6 in) long, each bud on a pedicel 3–6 mm (0.1–0.2 in) long. The buds are spindle-shaped with a conical, blunt-tipped operculum 3–4 mm (0.1–0.2 in) long, about the same length as the floral cup. The flowers are creamy white. Flowering occurs between November and January and the fruit is hemispherical or cone-shaped, 4–5 mm (0.16–0.20 in) long and wide.

== Taxonomy ==
Eucalyptus albida was first formally described in 1925 by Joseph Maiden and William Blakely and the description was published in Journal and Proceedings of the Royal Society of New South Wales. The type specimen was collected near Harrismith by Charles Gardner. The specific epithet (albida) is taken from the Latin word albidus meaning "whitish" in reference to the colour of the juvenile leaves.

== Distribution ==
White-leaved mallee grows in sand, often with gravel and over laterite, in kwongan and shrubland. It is found from Tammin and Narrogin east to Hyden and Ravensthorpe with a disjunct population near Badgingarra.

== Conservation ==
This eucalypt is classified as "not threatened" by the Western Australian Government Department of Parks and Wildlife.

== Uses ==
The juvenile leaves or coppice regrowth of this species is used by florists as a filler in dried flower arrangements and is referred to as rustle gum. The plant is drought and frost resistant in cultivation.

== See also ==
- List of Eucalyptus species
