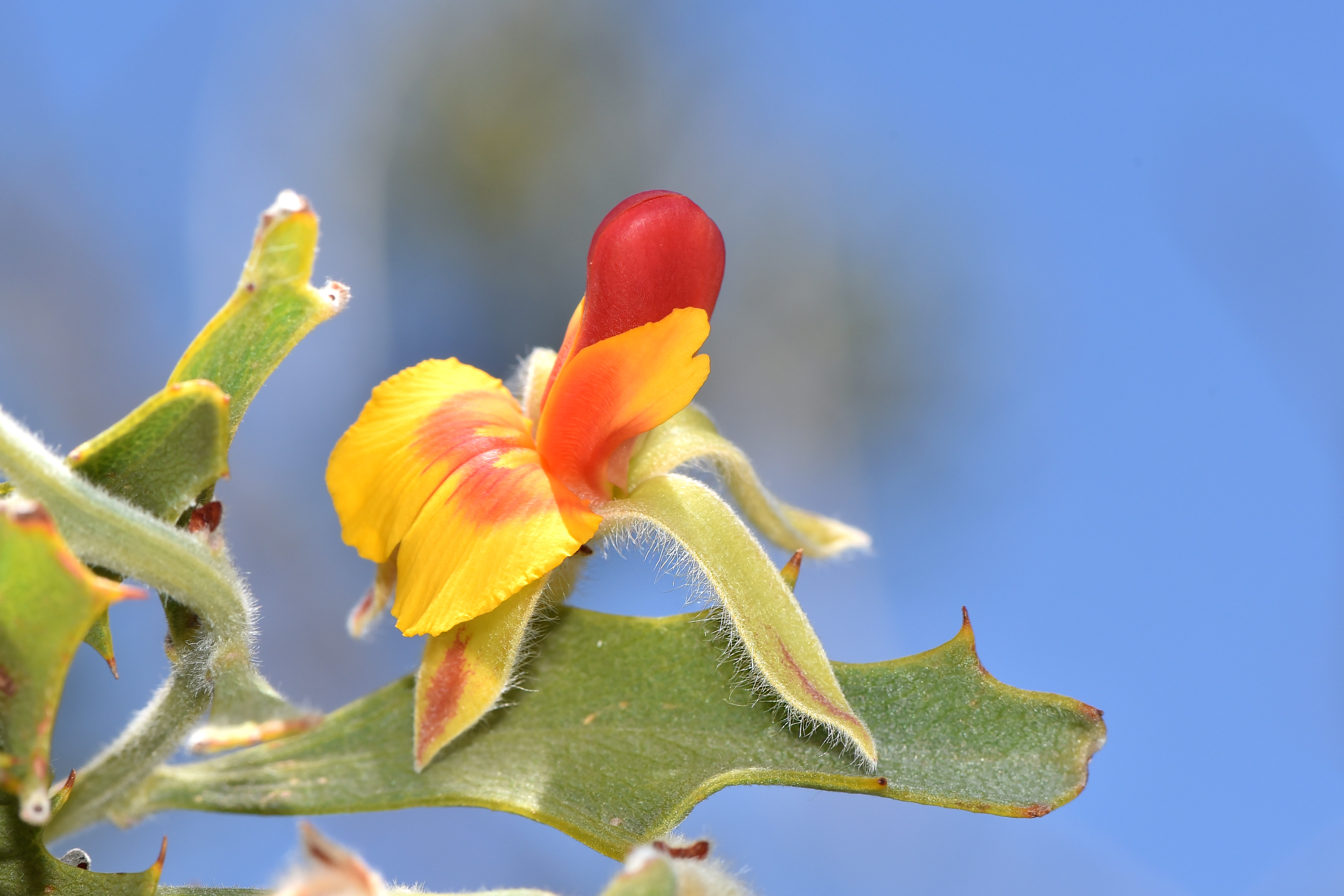
- Single flower on node of phylloclade

Conservation status
- Priority Three — Poorly Known Taxa (DEC)

Scientific classification
- Kingdom: Plantae
- Clade: Tracheophytes
- Clade: Angiosperms
- Clade: Eudicots
- Clade: Rosids
- Order: Fabales
- Family: Fabaceae
- Subfamily: Faboideae
- Genus: Jacksonia
- Species: J. anthoclada

Binomial name
- Jacksonia anthoclada Chappill

= Jacksonia anthoclada =

Species of legume

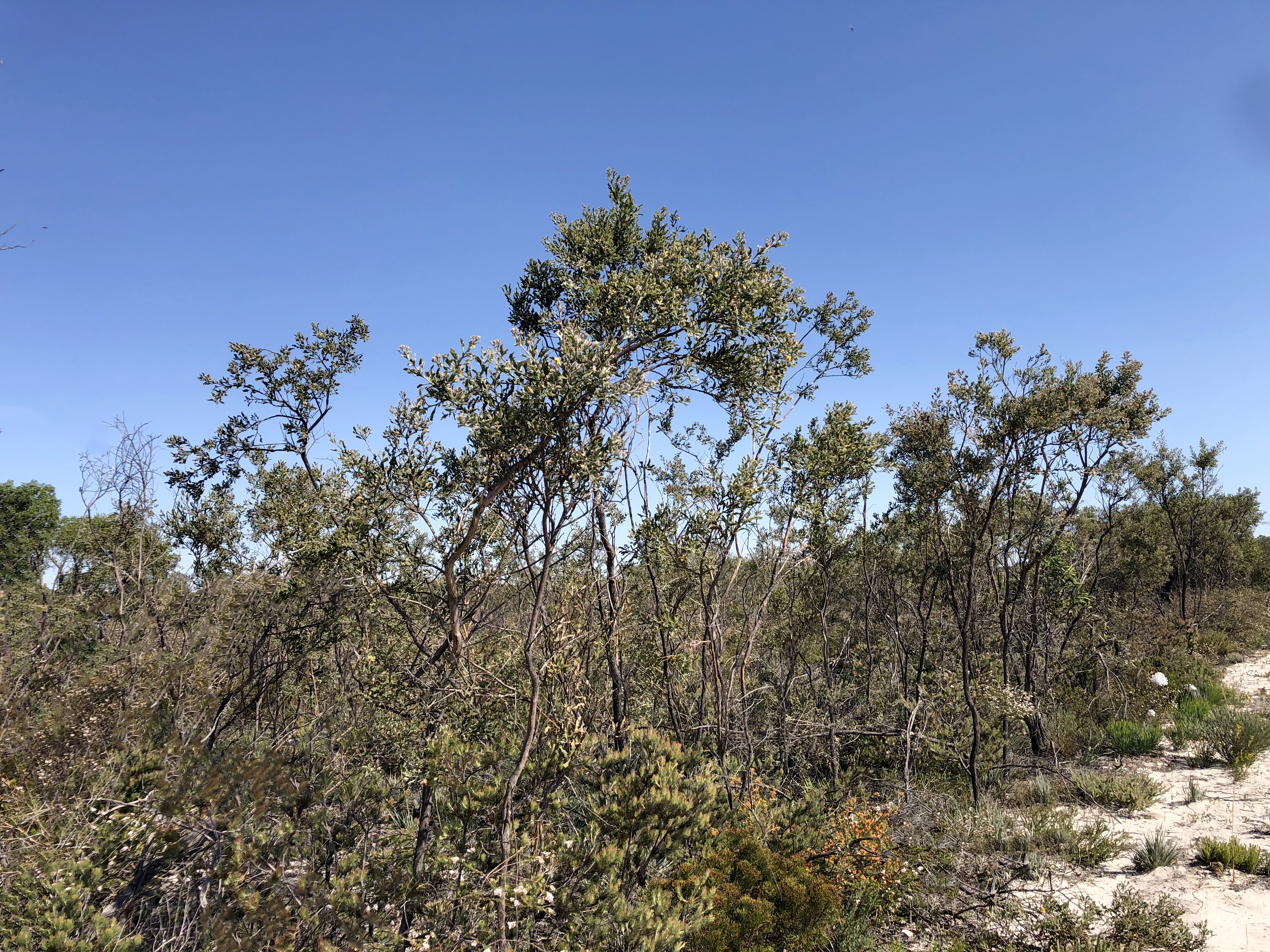
Habit in Badgingarra National Park

Jacksonia anthoclada is a species of flowering plant in the family Fabaceae and is endemic to the south-west of Western Australia. It is an erect, single-stemmed shrub with hairy, elliptic to egg-shaped phylloclades with sharply-pointed edges, yellow-orange flowers with red markings, and hairy, woody pods.

== Description ==
Jacksonia anthoclada is an erect, single-stemmed shrub that typically grows up to 1.5–2.5 m (4 ft 11 in – 8 ft 2 in) high and 0.5 m (1 ft 8 in) wide, its branches yellowish-brown. Its phylloclades are elliptic to egg-shaped with the narrower end towards the base, 28–133 mm (1.1–5.2 in) long, 11.5–24 mm (0.45–0.94 in) wide and hairy with prominent veins. The nodes on the edges of the phyllodes are sharply-pointed. The flowers are arranged singly on the nodes of the phyllocades on a pedicel 3.3–5.3 mm (0.13–0.21 in) long. There are egg-shaped bracteoles 2.7–7 mm (0.11–0.28 in) long on the pedicels but that sometimes fall off as the flowers open. The floral tube is 1.2–2.1 mm (0.047–0.083 in) long and the sepals are membranous, 11.7–17 mm (0.46–0.67 in) long and 2.5–4.8 mm (0.098–0.189 in) wide. The petals are yellow-orange with red markings, the standard petal 12.2–13.2 mm (0.48–0.52 in) long, the wings 6.3–6.5 mm (0.25–0.26 in) long, and the keel 7.3–8.5 mm (0.29–0.33 in) long. The stamens have green to pale pink filaments 9–13 mm (0.35–0.51 in) long. Flowering occurs from November to April, and the fruit is a woody, densely hairy, broadly elliptic pod 11.6–16.9 mm (0.46–0.67 in) long and 6.3–7.8 mm (0.25–0.31 in) wide.

== Taxonomy ==
Jacksonia anthoclada was first formally described in 2007 by Jennifer Anne Chappill in Australian Systematic Botany from specimens 6 km (3.7 mi) south of the Halfway Mill Roadhouse on the Brand Highway by Chappill and Carolyn F. Wilkins in 1991. The specific epithet (anthoclada) means 'a flower-shoot' referring to the flowers arranged singly on the phylloclades.

== Distribution and habitat ==
This species of Jacksonia grows on sandplains on tall shrubland south of Eneabba, east of Mount Lesueur and in Badgingarra National Park, in the Geraldton Sandplains bioregion of south-western Western Australia.

== Conservation status ==
Jacksonia anthoclada is listed as "Priority Three" meaning that it is poorly known and known from only a few locations but is not under imminent threat.
