= Deriades =

King of Pentapotamia in Greek Mythology

King Deriades (Ancient Greek: Δηριάδης) was a prominent figure in Greek mythology, featured as the king of the Indians in Nonnus of Panopolis epic poem, Dionysiaca. He serves as the primary antagonist to Dionysus during the god's mythical campaign to conquer India. The term "Indian" in Greco-Roman literature typically referred to the peoples of the Indus Valley.

== Background ==
King Deriades is described as the son of Hydaspes, the god of the river Hydaspes (modern-day Jhelum River in the Punjab region), and Astris, a celestial nymph. His divine lineage ties him to the natural elements of his homeland and positions him as a powerful mortal adversary.

Deriades ruled over the Indian (Modern day Indus Valley) forces and led the resistance against Dionysus, who sought to spread his cult and establish his divinity in the East.

== Mythology ==
In the Dionysiaca, King Deriades is portrayed as a formidable and proud ruler, embodying resistance to Dionysus's divine mission. Some key aspects of his role include:

Leader of the Indian Army

Deriades commands a vast coalition of warriors, often described in grandiose terms. His army includes mighty champions such as Colletes, and his forces are depicted as exotic and immensely powerful.

Conflict with Dionysus

Deriades defies Dionysus's claim to godhood and refuses to accept his cult. This sets the stage for a series of epic battles between the armies of Dionysus and the Indus Valley forces.

Defeat and Death

Despite his valor and the strength of his army, Deriades is ultimately defeated. His death signifies the triumph of divine will and the inevitable success of Dionysus's mission.

== Cultural and historical context ==
Although Deriades is a fictional character, his story in the Dionysiaca draws inspiration from the Greeks' historical encounters with the Indus Valley, particularly during Alexander's invasion of the Indus Valley in 326 BCE. The Greek conception of "India" blended real geography with mythological imagery, and Deriades embodies this synthesis.
