= Mendeis =

Greek mythological figure

In Greek mythology, Mendeis (Ancient Greek: Μενδέις) was a Thracian nymph who became the mother of Pallene by King Sithon. Her husband had the habit of killing one by one the suitors of her daughter. In some accounts, Pallene's mother was called Anchiroe instead. Mendeis might have been associated with the city of Mende.
