= Sithon (mythology) =

Mythical king of the Odomanti

In Greek mythology, Sithon (/ˈsaɪθɒn/ or /ˈsaɪθən/; Ancient Greek: Σίθων, romanized: Síthōn) was a king of the Odomanti or Hadomanti in Thrace, and presumably the eponym of the peninsula Sithonia and the tribe Sithones.

== Family ==
Sithon was the son of either Poseidon and Ossa or of Ares and Anchiroe. He was married to the nymph Mendeis, though Anchiroe is otherwise also given as his wife rather than mother, and had at least two daughters: Rhoeteia, eponym of the promontory of Rhoetium in the Troad, and Pallene. One source gives him as the father of the Thracian princess Phyllis, who loved Demophon of Athens. Her parentage is otherwise attributed to Lycurgus, a similar Thracian king figure.

== Mythology ==
Sithon promised both the hand of Pallene and his kingdom to the one who would defeat him in single combat. Pallene was so beautiful that a lot of suitors sought her hand, but all of them, including Merops of Anthemusia and Periphetes of Mygdonia, were slain by Sithon. As he grew older and his strength began to fail him, he arranged that the suitors fight each other instead of himself until one of them was killed; the winner would then get both Pallene and the kingdom. When two new wooers, Dryas and Cleitus, arrived, Pallene fell in love with Cleitus. Out of fear for him, she cried so much that her old tutor realized what her feelings were and decided to help. As the suitors were supposed to fight on chariots, he bribed Dryas' charioteer so that he left undone the pins of the chariot wheels. So when Dryas attacked, the wheels came off and he fell to the ground, and was defeated and killed by Cleitus with ease. Sithon became aware of the stratagem and was outraged so much that he intended to slay his daughter next to Dryas' funeral pyre. But the girl was saved by Aphrodite, who appeared at night in front of the inhabitants of the country; alternatively, a sudden heavy shower was sent down by the gods, making Sithon change his mind. He married Pallene to Cleitus; after his death they inherited the kingdom, and the country as well as a city in Thrace subsequently received the name of Pallene.

A different story of Sithon and Pallene is found in Nonnus' Dionysiaca. According to it, Sithon was in love with his own daughter, and that was the reason why he was killing her wooers one after another. This lasted until one day Dionysus came and suggested that he would fight for Pallene's hand with the maiden herself. Sithon agreed, and Dionysus wrestled with Pallene in a manner that was more like seducing her. Sithon interrupted and pronounced the god winner; Dionysus then killed the king with his thyrsus, thus avenging the deaths of the previous suitors. He consorted with Pallene, although he stayed with her for but a night.

The myths of Sithon, Pallene and the suitors are similar to those of Oenomaus, Hippodamia and Pelops.

This Sithon might be the Sithon that according to Ovid in the Metamorphoses "became of indeterminate sex, now man, now woman," used as a parallel to his depiction of Hermaphroditus becoming androgynous after merging with the nymph Salmacis. This aside refers to an unknown myth about Sithon common knowledge in Ovid's time but that has now been lost.
