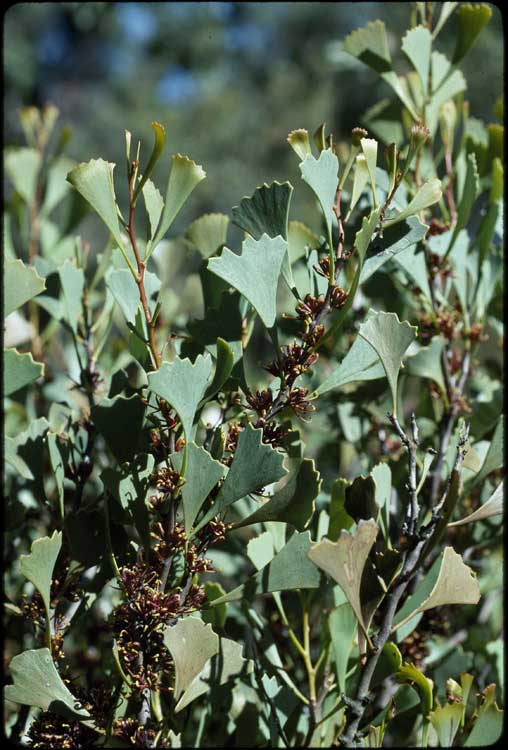
- Hakea flabelliflora in Kings Park Botanic Garden

Scientific classification
- Kingdom: Plantae
- Clade: Tracheophytes
- Clade: Angiosperms
- Clade: Eudicots
- Order: Proteales
- Family: Proteaceae
- Genus: Hakea
- Species: H. flabellifolia

Binomial name
- Hakea flabellifolia Meisn.
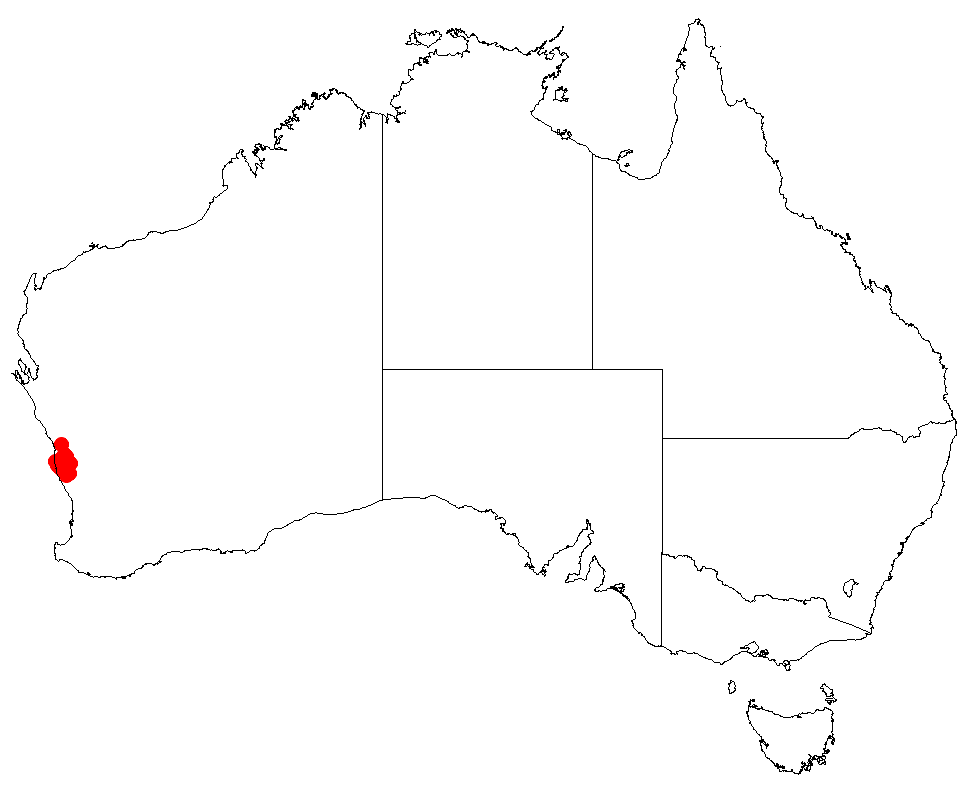
- Occurrence data from AVH

= Hakea flabellifolia =

Species of shrub endemic to Western Australia

Hakea flabellifolia, commonly known as the fan-leaved hakea or wedge hakea, is a shrub in the family Proteaceae. It is endemic to an area along the west coast in the Mid West and Wheatbelt regions of Western Australia.

== Description ==
The erect, spreading shrub typically grows to a height of 0.3 to 1 metre (1 to 3 ft) and forms a lignotuber. A multi-stemmed species with slender upright branchlets. The thick, flat, fan-shaped leaves are 3–8 cm (1–3 in) long and 2–5 cm (0.8–2 in) wide and have small irregular blunt teeth ending in long tapering base. It blooms from October to November and produces green-red-brown strongly scented flowers in the leaf axils and along old wood. The slightly rough fruit are large 6 cm (2.4 in) long, 3 cm (1 in) wide at the apex and tapering to the base with an obscure beak.

== Taxonomy and naming ==
Hakea flabellifolia was first formally described in 1855 by Swiss botanist Carl Meisner and the description was published in Hooker's Journal of Botany and Kew Garden Miscellany. It is named from the Latin flabellum 'small fan' and folium 'a leaf', referring to the fan shaped appearance of the leaves.

== Distribution and habitat ==
This species grows on sand, loam, and lateritic gravel in heathland from the northern sand plains at Eneabba and south to Dandaragan. It requires an open sunny aspect with good drainage.

== Conservation status ==
Hakea flabellifolia is classified as "not threatened" by the Western Australian Government Department of Parks and Wildlife.
