= Hydissus =

Town of ancient Caria

Coordinates: 37°08′20″N 27°48′41″E

Hydissus or Hydissos (Ancient Greek: Ὑδισσός), Hydisus or Hydisos (Ὑδισός), or Hydissa (Ὕδισσα) was a town of ancient Caria, situated south of Mylassa. Hydissus was a polis (city-state) and a member of the Delian League.

Its site is located near Karacahisar, Muğla Province, Turkey.
