= Astris =

Figure in Greek mythology

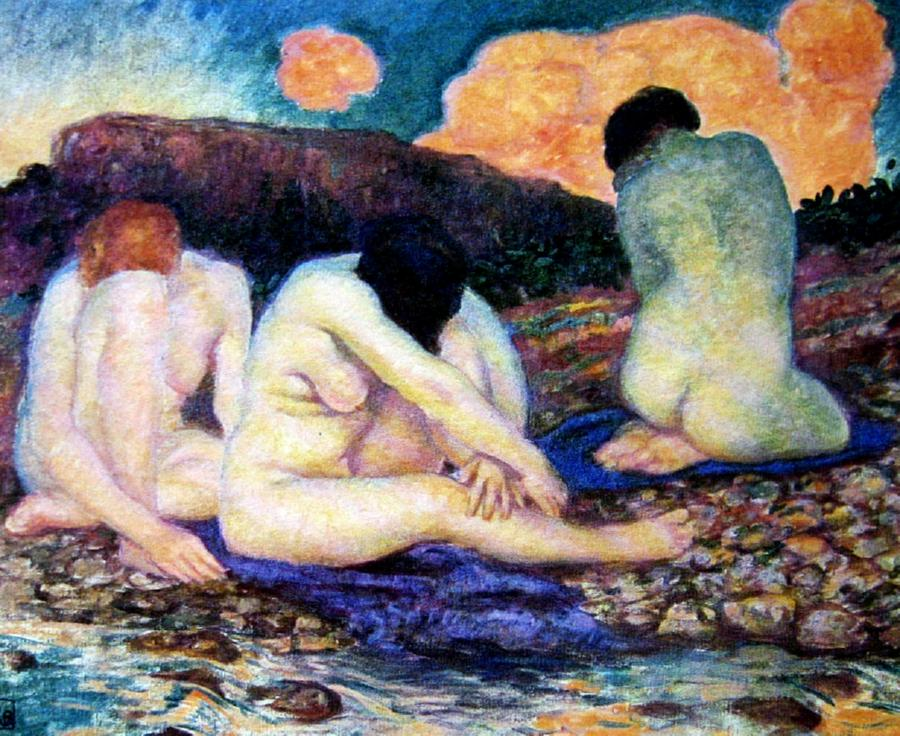
Heliades by Rupert Bunny

In Greek mythology, Astris (Ancient Greek: Ἀστρὶς, lit. 'derived from ἀστήρ astêr meaning 'star' or 'starry') or Asteria was, in Nonnus's Dionysiaca, one of the Heliades, daughters of Helios, either by the Oceanid Clymene or the Oceanid Ceto. She married the river god Hydaspes (the modern Jhelum River) and became mother of Deriades, king of the Indians.

== Other uses ==
The third stage of the ELDO Europa rocket was named after the deity : Astris.

== See also ==
- Heliades
- Heliadae
- Phaethon
