= Ceto (mythology) =

Greek water deities

In Greek mythology, Ceto (/ˈsiːtoʊ/; Ancient Greek: Κητώ, romanized: Kētṓ, lit. 'sea monster' or 'whale') may refer to three divine women:

- Ceto, a primordial sea goddess and daughter of Pontus (Sea) and Gaia (Earth). She was the mother of the Phorcydes by her brother Phorcys.
- Ceto, a "naiad daughter of Oceanus" and thus one of the Oceanids. Her mother was probably the Titaness Tethys. Ceto bore Helios a daughter, Astris.
- Ceto, the Nereid of sea-monsters and one of the 50 sea nymph daughters of the "Old Man of the Sea" Nereus and the Oceanid Doris.
