= Astraeus (beetle) =

Scientific classification
- Kingdom: Animalia
- Phylum: Arthropoda
- Class: Insecta
- Order: Coleoptera
- Suborder: Polyphaga
- Infraorder: Elateriformia
- Family: Buprestidae
- Subfamily: Polycestinae
- Genus: Astraeus; Laporte & Gory, 1837

Genus of beetles

Astraeus is a genus of "jewel beetles" in the subfamily Polycestinae, containing the following species:

- Astraeus aberrans van de Poll, 1886
- Astraeus acaciae Barker, 1999
- Astraeus adamsi Barker, 1975
- Astraeus aridus Barker, 1989
- Astraeus badeni van de Poll, 1889
- Astraeus bakeri Barker, 1975
- Astraeus blackdownensis Barker, 1977
- Astraeus caledonicus Fauvel, 1904
- Astraeus carnabyi Barker, 1975
- Astraeus carteri Barker, 1975
- Astraeus crassus van de Poll, 1889
- Astraeus crockerae Barker, 1977
- Astraeus cyaneus Kerremans, 1900
- Astraeus dedariensis Barker, 1975
- Astraeus dilutipes van de Poll, 1886
- Astraeus elongatus van de Poll, 1886
- Astraeus flavopictus Laporte & Gory, 1837
- Astraeus fraseriensis Barker, 1975
- Astraeus fraterculus van de Poll, 1889
- Astraeus globosus Barker, 1975
- Astraeus goerlingi Barker, 1975
- Astraeus goldingi Barker, 2007
- Astraeus hanloni Barker, 2007
- Astraeus intricatus Carter, 1925
- Astraeus irregularis van de Poll, 1889
- Astraeus jansoni van de Poll, 1889
- Astraeus kitchini Barker, 2004
- Astraeus lineatus van de Poll, 1889
- Astraeus macmillani Barker, 1975
- Astraeus major Blackburn, 1890
- Astraeus mastersii Macleay, 1872
- Astraeus mayoi Barker, 2007
- Astraeus meyricki Blackburn, 1890
- Astraeus minutus Barker, 1975
- Astraeus mourangeensis Barker, 1977
- Astraeus multinotatus van de Poll, 1889
- Astraeus navarchis (Thomson, 1856)
- Astraeus oberthuri van de Poll, 1889
- Astraeus obscurus Barker, 1975
- Astraeus occidentalis Barker, 1989
- Astraeus polli Barker, 1975
- Astraeus powelli Barker, 1995
- Astraeus princeps Barker, 1989
- Astraeus prothoracicus van de Poll, 1889
- Astraeus pygmaeus van de Poll, 1886
- Astraeus robustus Barker, 1975
- Astraeus samouelli Saunders, 1868
- Astraeus simulator van de Poll, 1889
- Astraeus smythi Barker, 1975
- Astraeus sundholmi Barker, 2007
- Astraeus tamminensis Barker, 1975
- Astraeus vittatus van de Poll, 1889
- Astraeus watsoni Barker, 1975
- Astraeus williamsi Barker, 1989
- Astraeus yarrattensis Barker, 1989
