= Anchiroe of Thrace =

In Greek mythology, Anchiroe or Ankhiroê (Ancient Greek: Αγχιροη means 'pouring flow'), also called Anchinoe or Archinoe, was the consort of Sithon, son of Ares, and the mother of two daughters, Pallene and Rhoetea, from whom two towns derived their names. In some accounts, Achiroe was the mother of Sithon, Pallene and Rhoeteia by Ares instead.
