= Pallene (daughter of Sithon) =

Mythological Thraco-Macedonian princess

In Greek mythology, Pallene (/pəˈliːniː/, pə-LEE-nee; Ancient Greek: Παλλήνη, romanized: Pallḗnē pronounced [pallɛ̌ːnɛː]) is a Macedonian or Thracian princess, the daughter of King Sithon who ruled over Odomantice, an ancient region right where Macedonia meets Thrace. Pallene saw many of her potential suitors die at the hands of her father, who decreed that only whoever beat him in fight would wed Pallene and rule the kingdom, until one day the life of the suitor she was in love with was at stake, forcing her to take the situation in her own hands. In other stories, she consorts with Dionysus, the god of festivity and wine.

The westernmost of the three Macedonian peninsulas (now known as Kassandra) and an ancient city were named in antiquity Pallene after her. Her homeland has also been identified with the Thracian peninsula, now called Gallipoli.

== Etymology ==
In the Macedonian Greek dialect, the name was also spelled with an initial beta instead of pi, Ballene (Βαλλήνη).

== Family ==
Pallene was the daughter of King Sithon by a nymph named Mendeis or Anchiroe. In some versions, she has a sister named Rhoetea. Pallene's homeland was situated in either Macedonia or Thrace, regions in southeast Europe which overlapped in some areas. Sithon was said to be king of Odomantice (roughly equivalent with the plain of Serres and Eastern Macedonia) or the Thracian Cherronesus, also known as Sithonia (the modern Gallipoli peninsula).

== Mythology ==
=== Dryas and Clitus ===
Pallene was a very beautiful and graceful princess, and her reputation travelled far, so that suitors from many places including the faraway lands of Illyria and Tanais flocked to ask for her hand. Sithon decreed that only whoever defeated him in fight could marry Pallene and inherit his kingdom. He beat and killed many potential grooms but in time he decided to make the suitors fight each other to death instead, either because his strength was failing him as he grew older, or because he realised he would have no son-in-law at all if he kept up the practice of slaughtering them en masse.

After this change of rules, next in line to the fight were Dryas and Clitus. Secretly from everyone else, Pallene was in love with Clitus and did not wish to see him die. She decided to rig the competition, or alternatively her desperate crying drew the attention of a sympathetic male slave, who comforted her at first and then heavily bribed Dryas' chariot-driver to undo the axle-pins of the chariot's wheels. When the day arrived for Dryas and Clitus' battle, Dryas charged against him but the wheels of his chariot came off, making it easy for Clitus to overpower and kill him.

But Sithon did not remain long in the dark about Pallene's cheating. When he arranged the funeral pyre and lifted the body of Dryas, he also attacked Pallene in rage and tried to slay her. Aphrodite then, the goddess of love who often paid visits to the Odomanti at night, intervened to save the unfortunate girl by snatching Pallene out of harm's way. In other authors a great downpour occurred at the time, which Sithon interpreted as a message to let Clitus marry Pallene and let everyone celebrate a wedding. When Sithon eventually died, Pallene and Clitus inherited the realm, which was called Pallene after her. Clitus is said to have had a daughter named Chrysonoe (or Torone) later in life, who might have been born to Pallene.

=== Dionysus ===
In a different version appearing in the Dionysiaca by Nonnus, the girl's victorious suitor is supplanted by the god Dionysus, acting as an agent of Justice against Sithon's sacrilegious crimes. In this version Sithon desired his own daughter carnally, employing all sort of methods to postpone and hinder her marriage, until in the end he simply ended up killing all the potential husbands. Dionysus wished to punish Sithon for the many unlawful murders of the suitors, so when he arrived at their kingdom, he pretended to be a mortal who had come for Pallene's hand in marriage, bringing many gifts.

Sithon announced that the maiden's hand would be decided in a wrestling match, and led Dionysus to the ring, where he was to fight the maiden herself, almost nude and covered in oil. In the presence of Aphrodite and Eros Pallene fought the god earnestly, but he took hold of her fast; his gentle movements and were more fitting to a lover than a fighter. The more they grappled, the more the god became enamored with the mortal girl, though he postponed his victory. Fearing for his daughter's life, Sithon declared Dionysus the winner in the end, and Dionysus responded by striking him dead with his thyrsus. As he rolled in the dust dying, he handed the thyrsus to his daughter. Pallene mourned her father as Dionysus comforted her. They celebrated their marriage and had sex, but Dionysus soon left to resume his adventures.

== Culture ==
Two authors are credited by Parthenius and Conon as the sources of the tales they wrote down; Hegesippus of Mecyberna, author of the Palleniaca, and Theagenes, who authored the Macedonica, both natives of Macedonia. Coins from the ancient Greek city of Potidaea on the Pallene peninsula (the westernmost peninsula of Chalcidice in Macedonia, now known as Kassandra) depict a nymph who has been identified with Pallene. Another city in Pallene, Aphytis, had a cult devoted to the nymphs and Dionysus. Sometimes however Pallene was also identified with the Thracian Chersonese (Gallipoli) in Eastern Thrace. The middle peninsula, Sithonia, derived its name from the Sithones, a branch of Thracians who lived there before the Argead Macedonians drove them out.

Pallene's typical tale seems to have been modeled on the tale of Pelops, in which King Oenomaus kills several of his daughter Hippodamia's suitors after beating them in a chariot race; Pelops acquires a fast chariot, bribes a servant to sabotage the king's chariot and having emerged victorious he marries the princess. The Dionysus episode on the other hand shares some elements with Odysseus' myth, particularly the slaughter of the suitors. In both cases Dionysus and Odysseus act as agents of justice who need to win their brides by proving their physical prowess while in disguise (Odysseus as a beggar, Dionysus as a mortal). Odysseus then kills the suitors avenging himself, while Dionysus kills Sithon, the murderer of the potential wooers, who, ironically, mirrors Odysseus in this instance.

== See also ==
- Hippodamia and Pelops
- Suitors of Penelope

== Bibliography ==
- Avery, Catherine B., ed. (1962). New Century Classical Handbook. New York, US: Appleton-Century-Crofts.
- Bell, Robert E. (1991). Women of Classical Mythology: A Biographical Dictionary. ABC-Clio. ISBN 9780874365818.
- Calasso, Roberto (July 25, 2019). The Marriage of Cadmus and Harmony. UK: Penguin. ISBN 978-0-141-99075-0.
- Conon, Narrations, surviving as one-paragraph summaries in the Bibliotheca (Library) of Photius, Patriarch of Constantinople, translated from the Greek by Brady Kiesling. Online version at the Topos Text Project.
- Grimal, Pierre (1987). The Dictionary of Classical Mythology. Wiley-Blackwell. ISBN 0-631-13209-0.
- Larson, Jennifer (2001). Greek Nymphs: Myth, Cult, Lore. Oxford, New York: Oxford University Press. ISBN 0-19-512294-1.
- Liddell, Henry George; Scott, Robert (1940). A Greek-English Lexicon, revised and augmented throughout by Sir Henry Stuart Jones with the assistance of Roderick McKenzie. Oxford: Clarendon Press. Online version at Perseus.tufts project.
- Nonnus of Panopolis, Dionysiaca. Volume III, W.H.D. Rouse. Cambridge, MA., Harvard University Press; London, William Heinemann, Ltd. 1940-1942. Text available online on Internet Archive.
- Parker, Robert (2003). Simon Hornblower; Antony Spawforth (eds.). Oxford Classical Dictionary. Oxford and New York: Oxford University Press. ISBN 0198606419. Internet Archive.
- Parthenius, Love Romances translated by Sir Stephen Gaselee (1882-1943), S. Loeb Classical Library Volume 69. Cambridge, MA. Harvard University Press. 1916. Online version at the Topos Text Project.
- Patay-Horváth, András (May 18, 2023). Transformations of Pelops: Myths, Monuments, and Cult Reconsidered. New York: Routledge. ISBN 978-0-367-76698-6.
- Shorrock, Robert (2001). The Challenge of Epic: Allusive Engagement in the Dionysiaca of Nonnus. Leiden, NED: BRILL. ISBN 90-04-11795-4.
- Smith, William (1873). A Dictionary of Greek and Roman Biography and Mythology. London, UK: John Murray, printed by Spottiswoode and Co. Online version at the Perseus.tufts library.
- Stephanus of Byzantium, Stephani Byzantii Ethnicorum quae supersunt, edited by August Meineike (1790-1870), published 1849. A few entries from this important ancient handbook of place names have been translated by Brady Kiesling. Online version at the Topos Text Project.
- Tripp, Edward (June 1970). Crowell's Handbook of Classical Mythology (1st ed.). Thomas Y. Crowell Co. ISBN 069022608X.
- Tzetzes, John, Lycophronis Alexandra. Vol. II: Scholia Continens, edited by Eduard Scheer, Berlin, Weidmann, 1881. Internet Archive.
