= Astraeus (mythology) =

Various figures in Greek mythology

In Greek mythology, Astraeus or Astraios (/əˈstriːəs/; Ancient Greek: Ἀστραῖος means "starry") may refer to three various figures:

- Astraeus, son of Eurybia and Crius. He was the father of the four Anemoi by his wife Eos.
- Astraeus, son of Silenus and chief of the satyrs who came to join Dionysus in the Indian War.
- Astraeus, a Mysian son of Poseidon. In the height of Athena's nocturnal solemnities, he deflowered his sister by mistake and took a ring at the same time from her finger. The next day, understanding the error which he had committed, Astraeus in his grief threw himself headlong into the river Adurus. This was called later on Astraeus after him and afterwards changed into the Caicus, the son of Hermes.
