= Badgingarra National Park =

National park in Western Australia

- IUCN category II (national park)
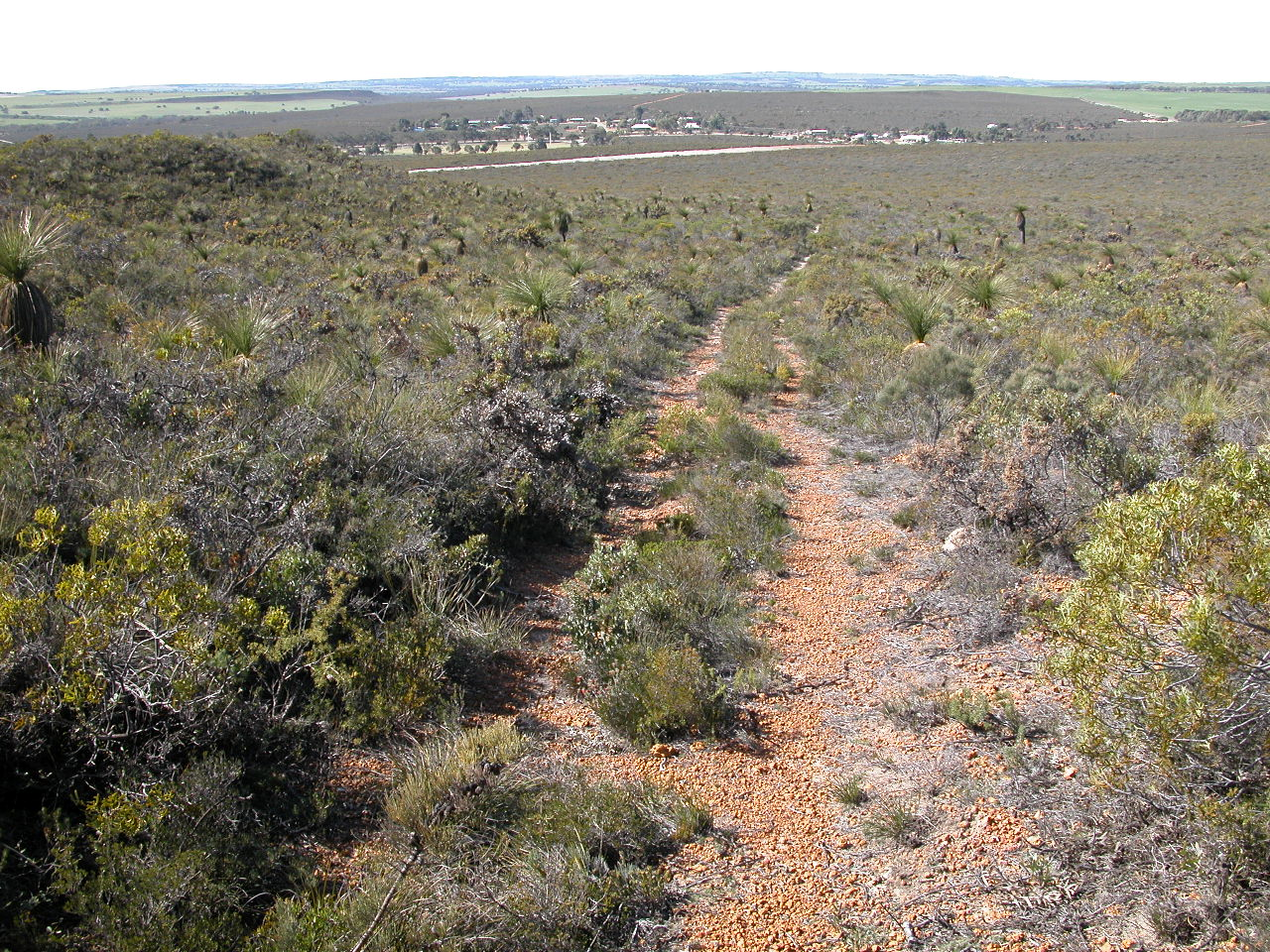
- The view from a breakaway looking south-east towards the township of Badgingarra

- Location within Western Australia
- Location: Western Australia
- Nearest city: Badgingarra
- Coordinates: 30°28′07″S 115°26′23″E
- Area: 131.08 km^{2} (50.61 sq mi)
- Established: 1973
- Governing body: Parks and Wildlife Service
- Website: http://www.dec.wa.gov.au/component/option,com_hotproperty/task,view/id,66/Itemid,1584/

Badgingarra National Park is a national park in Western Australia, 190 km north of Perth off the Brand Highway adjacent to the town of Badgingarra.

The park is 13,108 hectares (32,390 acres) in area and features high breakaway country overlooking low undulating sandplains. The park is renowned for its incredible diversity of endemic wildflowers. Mullering Brook passes through the park creating a swampy area.

The area is mostly composed of low scrub with plant species such as mottlecah, smokebush, Banksia, Verticordia, kangaroo paw and the rare Badgingarra mallee are found throughout the area. The area is threatened by the spread of dieback.

Some of the spectacular wildflowers that can be found within the park include rare species such as Hakea flabellifolia, Strangea cynanchicarpa and Eucalyptus pendens.

Many animals such as western grey kangaroos, emus, bustards and wedgetail eagles also inhabit the area.
