= Rhoeteia =

In Greek mythology, Rhoeteia (Ancient Greek: Ῥοιτεία, romanized: Rhoiteia) was the name which can be attributed to two distinct women who gave their name to the Trojan promontory of Rhoeteium. These two might be related by blood.

- Rhoeteia, a Thracian princess as daughter of the King Sithon and the naiad Achiroe. She was a sister of Pallene.
- Rhoiteia, a daughter of the sea-god Proteus. Her possible mother was princess Torone (Chrysonoe), daughter of King Cleitus of Sithonia and Pallene, the sister of the above Rhoeteia.
