= Antheia =

Epithet of Hera and Aphrodite

In Ancient Greek religion, Antheia or Anthea (Ancient Greek: Ἀνθεία, lit. 'Flower goddess') may refer to the following characters:

- Antheia, one of the seven Hesperides according to a lekythos by Asteas. The other six were called Aiopis, Donakis, Calypso, Mermesa, Nelisa and Tara.
- Anthea, one of the fifty daughters of Thespius and Megamede, who spent fifty nights with Heracles, one each night.
- Antheia, an epithet of both the goddesses Hera and Aphrodite. According to the geographer Pausanias, there was a temple of Hera Antheia at Argos, while according to Hesychius, Antheia was a name used for Aphrodite at Knossos.

Anthe (Ancient Greek: Ἄνθη, romanized: Anthē, lit. 'blossom' or 'flower') is a variant of the same name which refer to:

- Anthe, one of the Alcyonides, who, after the death of their father, the giant Alcyoneus, threw themselves into the sea and were transformed into ice birds by Amphitrite.
- Anthe, one of the Maenads, female followers of Dionysus.
