= Badgingarra, Western Australia =

Town in Wheatbelt region of Western Australia

Badgingarra
- Town
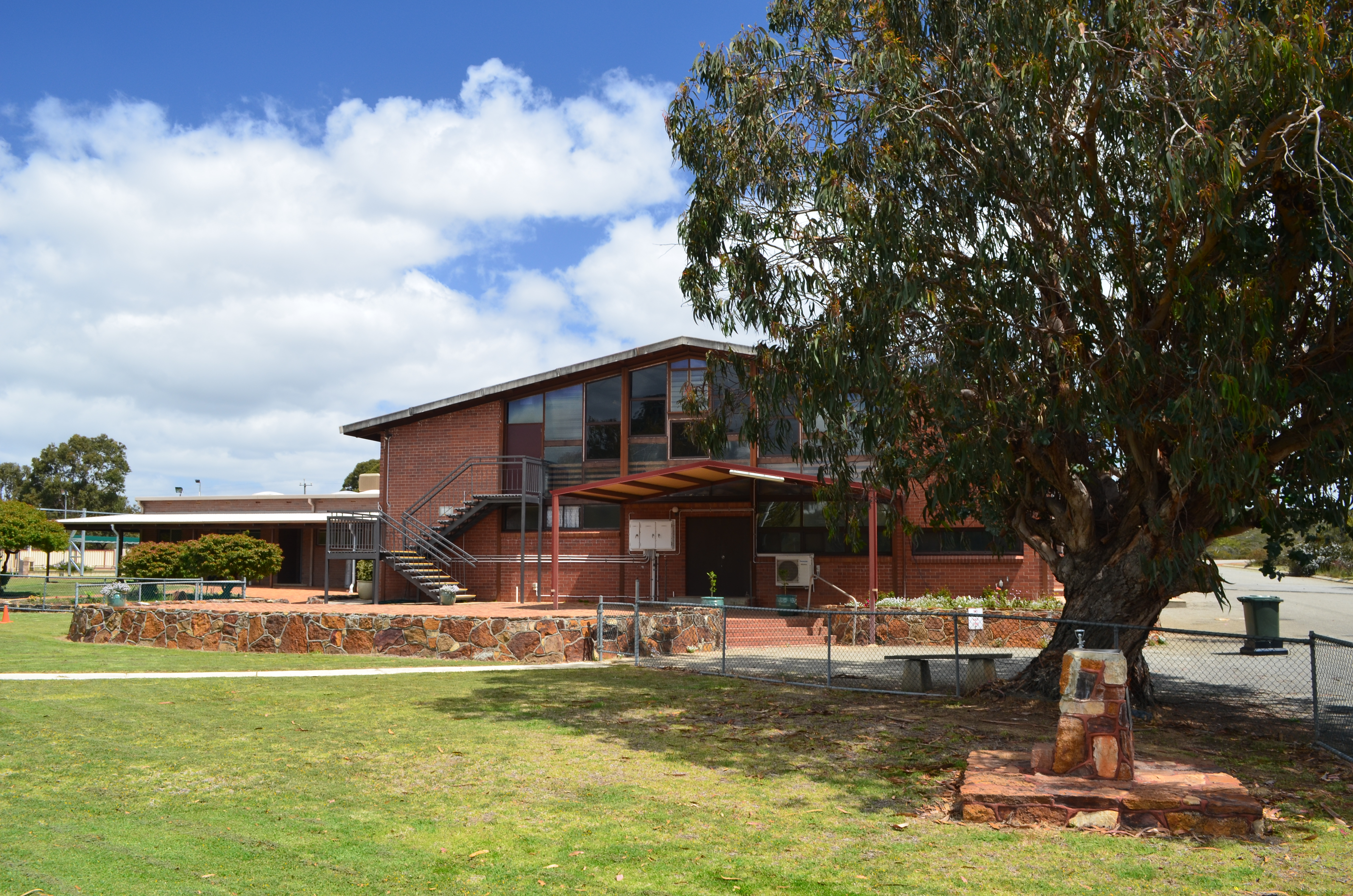
- Badgingarra Community Centre, 2013

- Interactive map of Badgingarra
- Coordinates: 30°23′24″S 115°30′05″E
- Country: Australia
- State: Western Australia
- LGA: Shire of Dandaragan
- Location: 209 km (130 mi) N of Perth; 60 km (37 mi) NW of Moora; 63 km (39 mi) E of Jurien Bay
- Established: 1955

Government
  - State electorate: Moore
  - Federal division: Durack

Area
  - Total: 1,126.6 km^{2} (435.0 sq mi)

Population
  - Total: 173 (SAL 2021)
- Postcode: 6521

Badgingarra is a small town in the Wheatbelt region of Western Australia, about 205 kilometres (127 mi) north of Perth in the Shire of Dandaragan. It lies on the Brand Highway adjacent to the Badgingarra National Park.

== History ==
The town was gazetted in 1955 and takes its name from nearby Badgingarra Pool. "Badgingarra" is a Noongar word said to mean "water by the manna gums".

The district was originally surveyed in the 1880s; however, due to the widespread presence of poisonous plants in the area and non-conducive soil types, the land was not developed for agriculture. Little settlement occurred until the 1950s, when the use of trace elements such as zinc and copper in fertilisers allowed for farming to occur on the sandy soils around Badgingarra.

In 1955, sufficient population growth had occurred for the gazettal of a townsite to support the settlers. In 1959, the state government established the Badgingarra Research Station, to assist farmers in the development of their enterprises. In 1965, a primary school was established, initially operated in the community hall before a new school was built and opened in 1968.

== Commercial area ==
Today, Badgingarra contains a primary school, tavern and post office, roadhouse and other businesses. It has several recreational facilities at its Community Centre, including tennis courts, a bowling green, a football oval, a golf course, parks and playgrounds.

The planned development of the Brand Highway 7 kilometres (4 mi) west of the Badgingarra townsite spurred the people of Badgingarra to resolve to shift the townsite so as to lie on that highway.

== Natural disasters ==
A large bushfire swept through the area in 2010, devastating 19 farms and over 10,000 hectares (24,711 acres) of farm land. At least 1,700 head of cattle were lost along with sheep, crops, a sandalwood plantation and fences.

The town was lashed by storms in 2012, receiving 50 millimetres (2.0 in) of rain in less than an hour, accompanied by driving winds and a large amount of hail, which destroyed crops.

== Climate ==
Climate data for Badgingarra
Month	Jan	Feb	Mar	Apr	May	Jun	Jul	Aug	Sep	Oct	Nov	Dec	Year
Record high °C (°F)	46.9 (116.4)	46.7 (116.1)	43.3 (109.9)	40.5 (104.9)	35.2 (95.4)	28.1 (82.6)	26.0 (78.8)	29.9 (85.8)	35.2 (95.4)	38.8 (101.8)	42.5 (108.5)	44.5 (112.1)	46.9 (116.4)
Mean daily maximum °C (°F)	34.7 (94.5)	34.7 (94.5)	31.9 (89.4)	27.1 (80.8)	22.6 (72.7)	18.8 (65.8)	17.6 (63.7)	18.2 (64.8)	20.6 (69.1)	24.5 (76.1)	28.5 (83.3)	32.2 (90.0)	26.0 (78.8)
Mean daily minimum °C (°F)	17.2 (63.0)	17.9 (64.2)	16.5 (61.7)	13.6 (56.5)	10.7 (51.3)	8.5 (47.3)	7.3 (45.1)	7.2 (45.0)	7.7 (45.9)	9.5 (49.1)	12.4 (54.3)	15.1 (59.2)	12.0 (53.6)
Record low °C (°F)	6.9 (44.4)	7.8 (46.0)	5.3 (41.5)	5.0 (41.0)	1.0 (33.8)	−0.1 (31.8)	1.3 (34.3)	0.1 (32.2)	0.5 (32.9)	0.4 (32.7)	1.7 (35.1)	4.0 (39.2)	−0.1 (31.8)
Average precipitation mm (inches)	10.4 (0.41)	15.1 (0.59)	15.4 (0.61)	25.9 (1.02)	66.2 (2.61)	97.3 (3.83)	102.7 (4.04)	84.7 (3.33)	47.4 (1.87)	26.4 (1.04)	17.7 (0.70)	8.5 (0.33)	517.7 (20.38)
Average precipitation days	2.4	2.6	3.5	6.5	11.0	14.3	16.5	15.2	12.1	8.1	5.3	3.0	100.5
Average relative humidity (%)	29	28	30	38	50	57	62	60	60	47	33	31	44
