= Metopes of the Parthenon =

Marble sculptures from the Acropolis of Athens

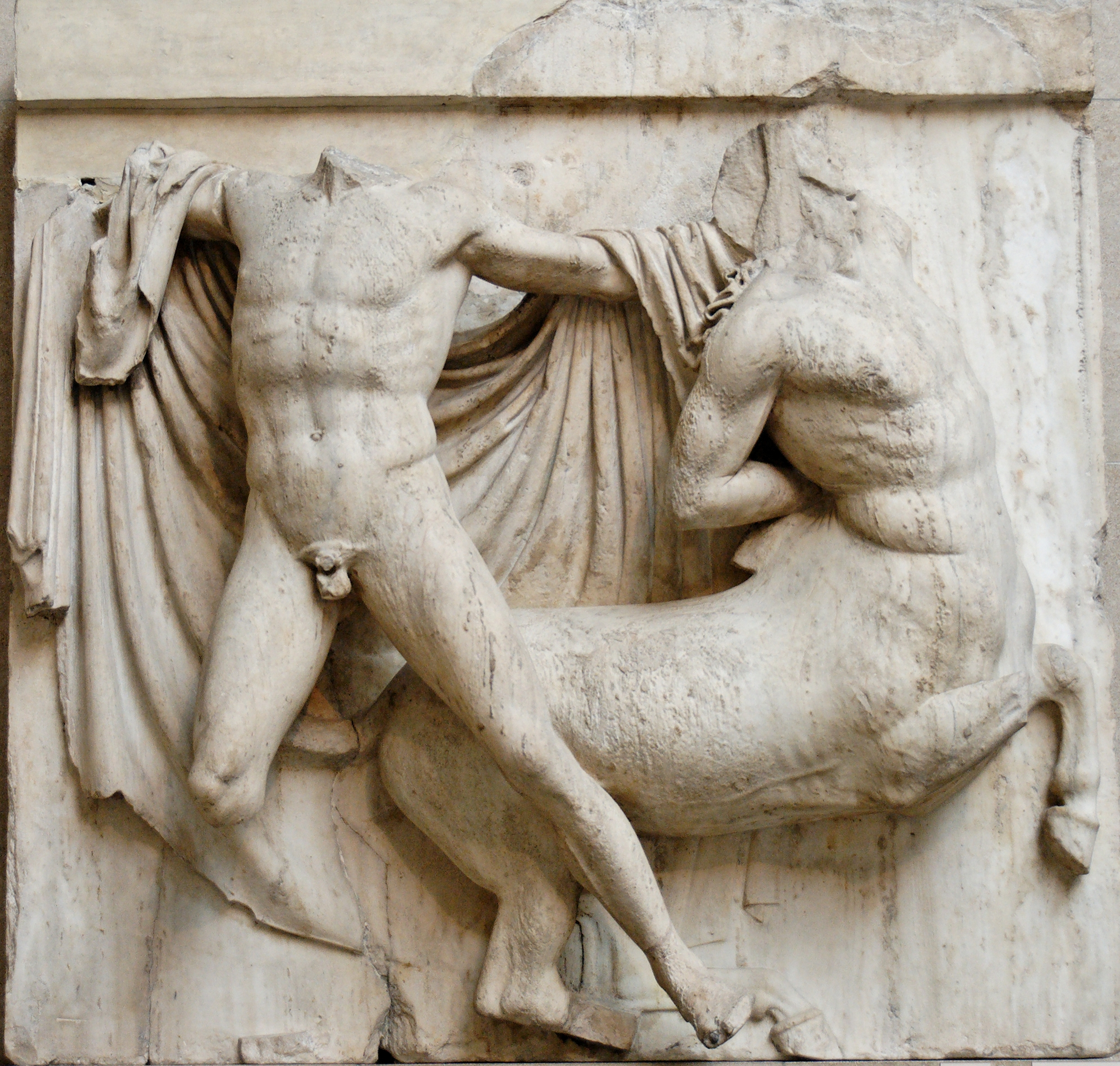
Metope south XXVII, Centaur and Lapith, British Museum.

The metopes of the Parthenon are the surviving set of what were originally 92 square carved plaques of Pentelic marble originally located above the columns of the Parthenon peristyle on the Acropolis of Athens. If they were made by several artists, the master builder was certainly Phidias. They were carved between 447 or 446 BC, or at the latest 438 BC, with 442 BC as the probable date of completion. Most of them are very damaged. Typically, they represent two characters per metope either in action or repose.

The interpretations of these metopes are only conjectures, starting from mere silhouettes of figures, sometimes barely discernible, and comparing them to other contemporary representations (mainly vases). There is one theme per side of the building, each featuring battle scenes: Amazonomachy in the west, the fall of Troy in the north, Gigantomachy in the east, and Centaurs and Lapiths in the south. The metopes have a purely warlike theme, like the decoration of the chryselephantine statue of Athena Parthenos housed in the Parthenon, and seem to be an evocation of the opposition between order and chaos, between the human and the animal (sometimes animal tendencies in the human), between civilization and barbarism. This general theme is considered to be a metaphor for the Persian wars and thus the triumph of the city of Athens.

The majority of metopes were systematically destroyed by Christians at the time of the transformation of the Parthenon into a church towards the sixth or the seventh century AD. A powder magazine installed in the building by the Ottomans exploded during the siege of Athens by the Venetians in September 1687, continuing the destruction. The southern metopes are the best preserved. Fifteen of them are in the British Museum in London and one is in the Louvre. Those of the other sides, badly damaged, are in the Acropolis Museum in Athens, or still in place on the building. Discussions between UK and Greek officials about the future of the metopes in London are ongoing.

== The Parthenon ==
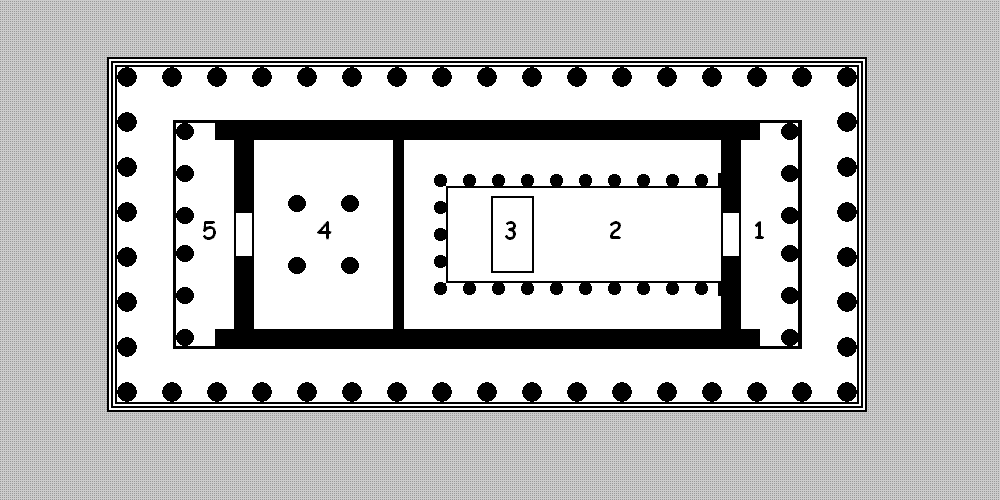
Plan of the Parthenon: 1) Pronaos (East side) 2) Naos Hekatompedon (East side) 3) Statue chryselephantine of Athena Parthenos 4) Parthenon (treasury) (West side) 5) Opisthodomos (West side)

In 480 BC, the Persians ransacked the Acropolis of Athens including the "pre-Parthenon" then under construction. After their victories at Salamis and Plataea the Athenians had sworn not to restore the destroyed temples, but to leave them as they are, in memory of the Persian "barbarism".

The power of Athens then grew gradually, mainly within the League of Delos which it controlled more and more hegemonically. Eventually, in 454 BC., the treasure of the league was transferred from Delos to Athens. A vast program of construction was then launched, financed by this treasure; among these, the Parthenon. This new building was not intended to become a temple, but a treasury to accommodate the colossal chryselephantine statue of Athena Parthenos.

The Parthenon was erected between 447 and 438 BC. The "pre-Parthenon" (little known) was hexastyle. Its successor, which was much larger, was octastyle (eight columns in front and seventeen on the sides of the peristyle) and measured 30.88 meters wide and 69.50 meters long. The sekos (closed part surrounded by the peristyle) in itself had a width of 19 meters. Thus, two large rooms would be created: one, to the east, to accommodate the statue of a dozen meters high; the other, to the west, to shelter the treasure of the league of Delos. The construction site was entrusted to Ictinos, Callicrates and Phidias The decor project was both traditional in its form (pediments and metopes) albeit unprecedented in scale. The pediments were bigger and more complex than what had been done before. The number of metopes (92), all carved, was unprecedented and never repeated. Finally, while the temple was of the Doric order, the decoration around the sekos (normally composed of metopes and triglyphs ) was replaced by a frieze of the ionic order.

== General description ==
=== Overall structure ===
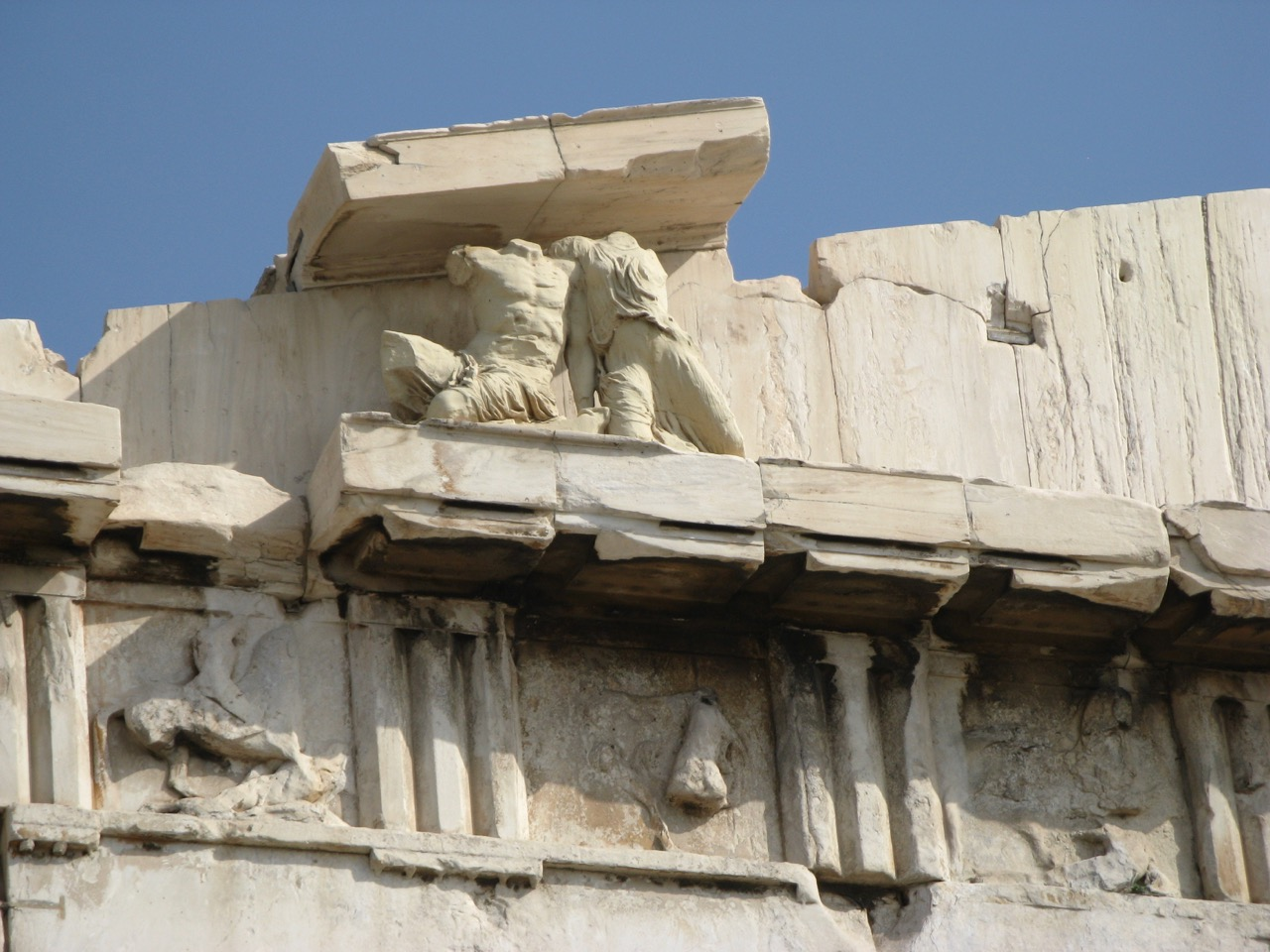
Metopes and triglyphs on the west pediment of the Parthenon

Annotated sectional view of the Parthenon with parts in the British Museum shaded

On Doric marble buildings, the metopes decorated the entablature above the architrave alternating with the triglyphs. These were a reminiscence of the wooden beams that supported the roof. The part between the triglyphs, at first a simple unadorned stone space, was quickly used to receive a carved decoration.

The Parthenon numbered 92 polychrome metopes: 14 on each of the east and west façades, and 32 on each of the north and south sides. To designate them, scholars usually number them from left to right with Roman numerals. They were carved on practically square Pentelic marble slabs: 1.20 meters high for a variable width, but averaging 1.25 meters. Originally, the block of marble measured 35 centimeters thick: the sculptures were made in high relief, standing out about 25 centimeters. The metopes were a dozen meters high and had an average of two characters each.

No ancient Greek building has ever been adorned with so many metopes, neither before nor after the construction of the Parthenon. On the Temple of Zeus at Olympia, which pre-dates the Parthenon, only those of the interior porch were carved; on the Temple of Hephaestus, contemporary with it, only those of the east façade, and the last four (towards the east) on the north and south sides, have been carved.

=== Themes and interpretations ===
There is no ancient description of metopes that could give a definitive interpretation. The first literary evocation of the carved decoration of the Parthenon was written by Pausanias in the second century AD; however, he only describes the pediments. Nevertheless, a comparison with the themes of contemporary Attic ceramics can suggest possible interpretations.

The general theme of the 92 metopes is purely warlike, as with the chryselephantine statue of Athena (Note: On the shield: on the outside, Amazons attack the Acropolis; inside, a gigantomachy. On the soles of sandals: a fight between Centaurs and Lapiths. (Schwab 2005, p. 167)) but in contrast to the pediments and the frieze. It seems to be an opposition between order and chaos, between the human and the animal (sometimes between the different animal tendencies in the human), between civilization and barbarism, even between the West and the East. The whole is often considered as a metaphor for the Persian war. An underlying theme could be that of marriage and the fact that the breakup of its harmony leads to chaos. (Note: Harmony of divine couples fighting side by side during gigantomachy; counter-example of the Amazons refusing the usual role of women; the fight of the Centaurs and Lapiths at the wedding of Pirithoos; Trojan war caused by the kidnapping of Helen. (Schwab 2005, p. 168)) From then on, as elsewhere on the Parthenon, there would be the celebration of the civic values whose marriage between citizens and daughters of citizens were its foundation.

The metopes on the east, north, and west sides have suffered chiefly from a systematic destruction by Christians around the sixth or the seventh century: it is therefore difficult to know exactly what they represented. To the east, the most religiously important side, the theme of the metopes would be the gigantomachy. Zeus and Hera (or Athena) would be represented on the central metopes, the fights being organized symmetrically around them. To the west, they represented Greeks fighting opponents in oriental costume. The most common interpretation is that it is amazonomachy; however, the metopes have suffered such damage that it is difficult to now know if the opponents of the Greeks are male or female. If it were men, then they could be Persians; however, there are few representations of Persians on horseback. During the siege of Athens by the Venetians of Francesco Morosini in 1687, the metopes on the north side were badly damaged by the explosion of the powder reserve housed in the Parthenon. However, identifications have been proposed: one of the metopes would represent Menelaus and his neighbour Helen; another one Aeneas and Anchises. The general theme of this side could therefore be the fall of Troy. Finally, the southern metopes were not damaged by Christian iconoclasm, but suffered from the explosion of 1687. The last remaining, located at each end of the Parthenon, represent the fight of the Centaurs and Lapiths, but the Central metopes, known only by drawings attributed to Jacques Carrey give rise to controversies of interpretation. Some archaeologists consider that it could be a purely Athenian fight between humans and centaurs.

=== Sculpture and painting ===
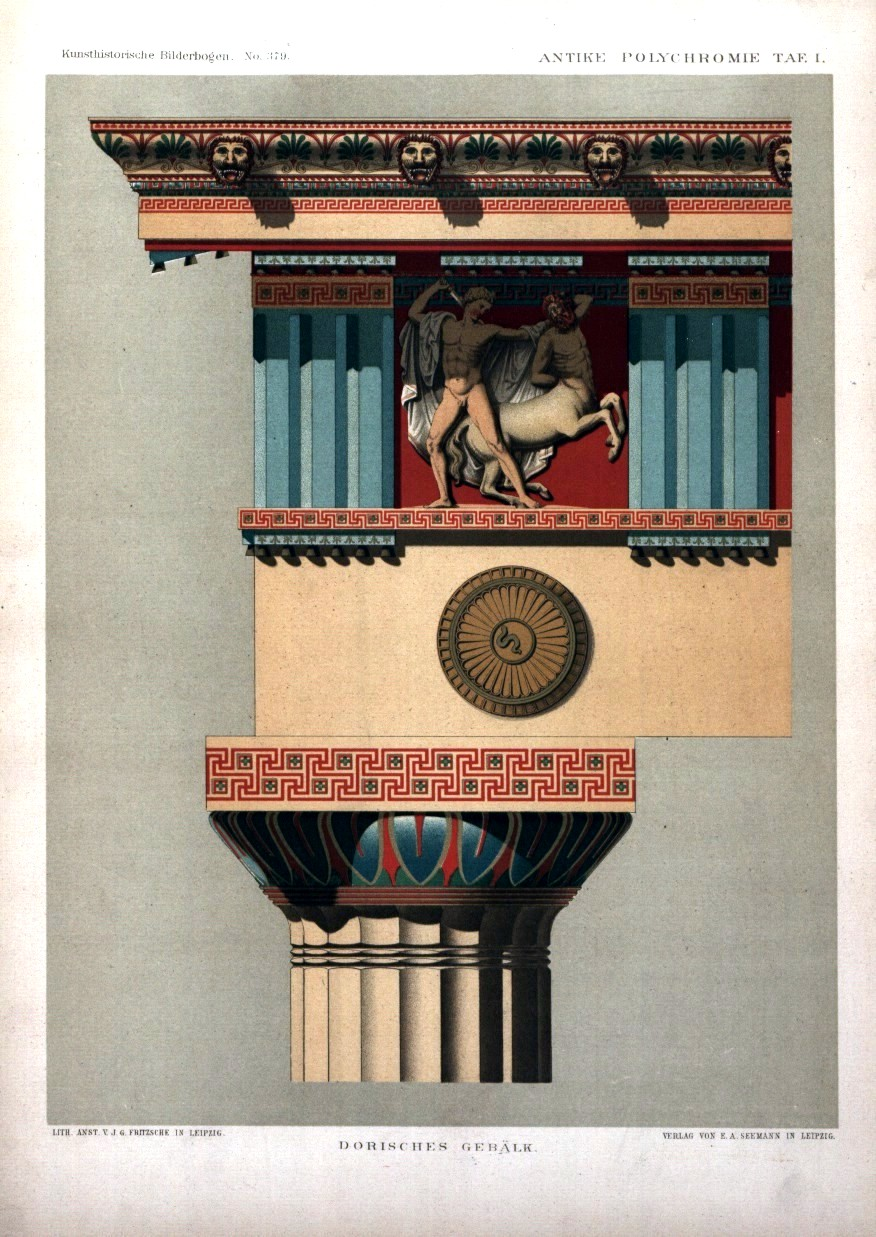
Reconstruction of the colours on the entableture of the Parthenon. "Kunsthistorische Bilderbogen", Verlag E. A. Seemann, Leipzig. 1883.

The metopes of the Parthenon were carved in several stages. The artist began by drawing the contours of his characters; he then removed the marble outside the drawing, to the "bottom" of the metope; he went on detaching the figure from the bottom; he finished by refining the characters themselves. It is possible that several sculptors, each specialized in one of these stages, could have collaborated. The sculpture work had to be done on the ground, before the metopes were put in place, at the top of the walls. The sculptors, necessarily many, surely began to work from 447 or 446 BC to complete their work before 438 BC, when the work for the roof began; 442 BC or shortly thereafter is a likely completion date. Moreover, if the carved decoration had to be finished, it was not the same for painting or metal ornaments that could be added later. Some artists might have worked on several metopes. Thus, for the metope east VI, Poseidon is in the same position as the Lapith on the southern metope II, while the falling giant is very close to the Lapith on the southern metope VIII, which could mean that they are from the same hand; unless this is only inspiration and imitation.

No sculptor's name has been preserved. However, since there are great differences in quality and style between the metopes, it is very likely that they were made by several hands. Some of them appear "old", seeming due to older or more conservative artists; but they could also have been done first. Those whose quality is not at the level of others also suggest that in view of the size of the site, it was necessary to employ all the sculptors available. The last hypothesis synthesizes all the others: at the beginning of the construction, many artists were hired; but as the work progressed, the incompetents were gradually discarded, not without having already produced the first metopes, of lower quality. Several southern metopes are of such quality that it has been concluded that they must have been carved among the last; (Note: It is even certain for south V, XXVII, XXVIII and XIX. (Berger 1986, p. 79)) in some cases, names of sculptors like Myron, Alcamenes or Phidias himself have been mentioned. Robert Spenser Stanier proposed in 1953 an estimate of a total cost of 10 talents for the realization of metopes.

The metopes of the Parthenon were, like the rest of the scenery, polychrome. The background was certainly red, in contrast with triglyphs in medium or dark blue. The cornice above the metope also had to be coloured. The characters were painted, with eyes, hair, lips, jewels and draperies raised. The skins of the male figures were to be darker than those of the female characters. Some metopes (Note: North: I, XXIX, XXXI and XXXII and east: VI and VII) included landscape features, perhaps painted as well. The decor was finished with the addition of elements (weapons, wheels or harness) in bronze or gilded bronze, as evidenced by the many fixing holes: there are more than 120 on the south metopes, the best-preserved ones. These decorative elements could also be used to identify the characters more quickly. There are very strong links between the subjects of the metopes and the chryselephantine statue of Athena preserved in the Parthenon. This could mean that Phidias was the site's prime contractor.

== History and conservation ==
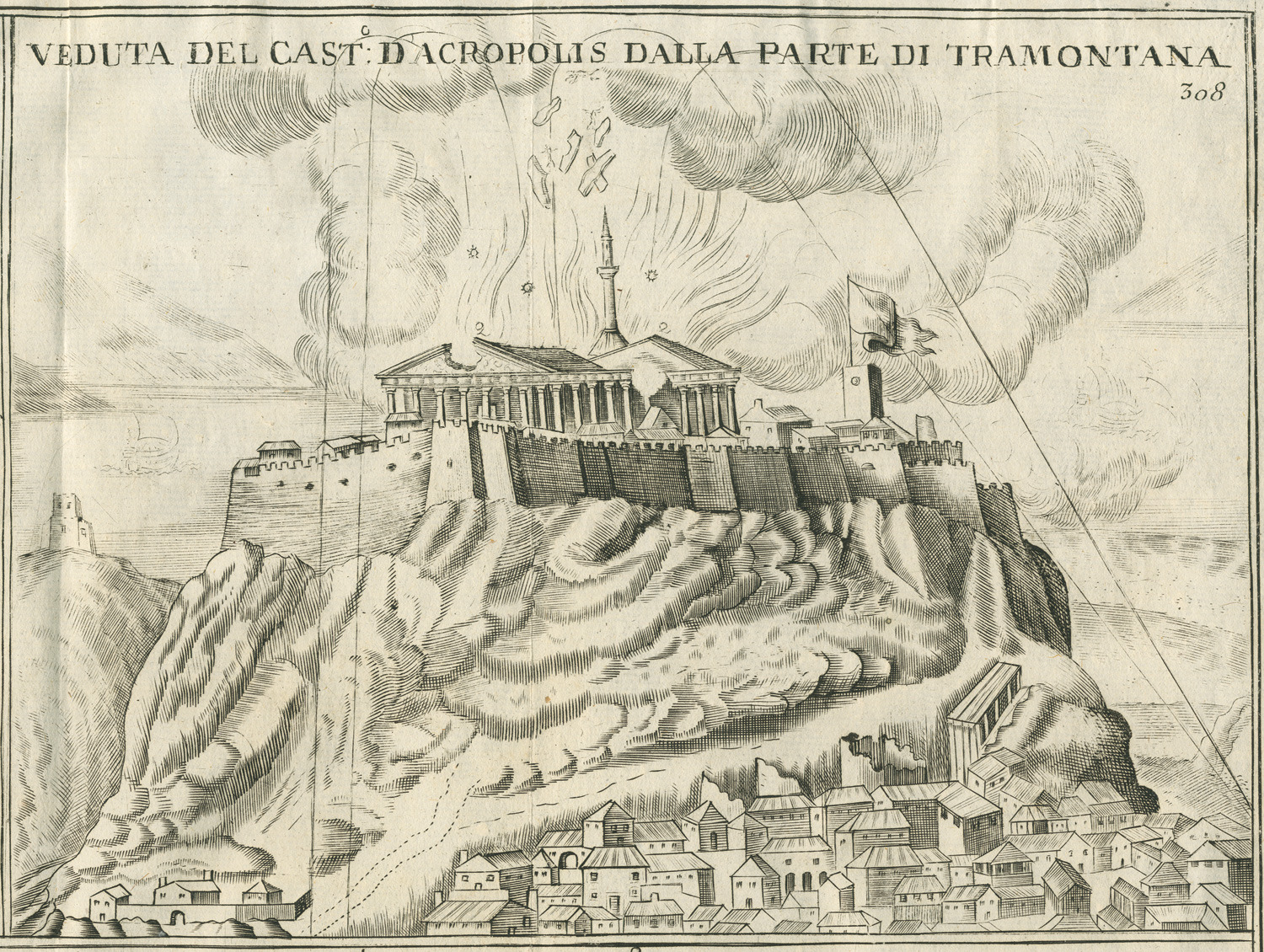
Explosion of the powder reserve installed in the Parthenon during the siege of Athens by the Venetians on September 26, 1687.

The Parthenon was ravaged by a fire on an ill-determined date during late antiquity, causing serious damage including the destruction of the roof. The intense heat cracked many marble elements, including entablatures and consequently metopes. An extensive restoration was carried out: the roof was redone but covered only the interior; the metopes were therefore more exposed (front and rear faces) to the weather. Until the Edict of Thessalonica in 380, the Parthenon retained its "pagan" religious role. It seems to have known then a more or less long period of abandonment. Somewhere between the sixth century and the seventh century, the building was turned into a church.

Until then, the ninety-two metopes had remained almost intact. Those on the east, west and north sides were then systematically damaged by the Christians, who wanted to erase the ancient gods. (Note: However, the exact date of the destruction of the metopes is unknown and cannot therefore be contextualised. Ascribing the act to Byzantine iconoclasticism is problematic since the pediments and the gods on the east frieze were not also systematically defaced. Anthony Kaldellis: The Christian Parthenon, Classicism and Pilgrimage in Byzantine Athens, Cambridge, 2009, p.42.) Only one northern metope, with two female figures, has survived, perhaps because interpreted as an Annunciation (the seated figure on the right interpreted as the Virgin Mary and the figure standing on the left as the Archangel Gabriel). The southern metopes have escaped, perhaps because this side of the Parthenon was too close to the edge of the Acropolis; perhaps because Physiologus includes the centaurs in his symbolic bestiary. The building, however, suffered no damage during the conversion of the Parthenon-church to a mosque in the fifteenth century, nor during the two centuries that followed. In 1674, an artist in the service of the Marquis de Nointel (French ambassador to the Porte), perhaps Jacques Carrey, drew a large part of the metopes which remained, unfortunately only on the south side. Much of the metopes were destroyed during the siege of Athens by the Venetians commanded by Francesco Morosini on 26 September 1687 during the explosion of the Parthenon powder reserve. After the departure of the Venetians in 1688, and the return of the Ottomans, the building again housed a mosque. The pieces of marble scattered around the ruins, including fragments of metopes, were reduced to lime or reused as building material, in the wall of the Acropolis, for example. In the eighteenth century, Western travellers, more and more numerous, seized pieces of sculpture as souvenirs.

=== Conservation ===
See also Elgin Marbles

Fifteen of the (Note: South II, III, IV, V, VI, VII, VIII, IX, XXVI, XXVII, XXVIII, XXIX, XXX, XXXI et XXXII.) South Metopes are in the British Museum as a result of the work of Lord Elgin's agents. The metope south VI arrived there by another way. It had fallen in a storm and had broken in three; members probably disappeared at the same time. In 1788, it was "stolen" (Note: This was the term Fauvel employed.) by Louis-François-Sébastien Fauvel with the complicity of a Turk: it was dropped from the top of the walls of the Acropolis on to a pile of manure below. However, it was not shipped until 1803 when it was dispatched aboard the corvette L'Arabe. This ship was boarded by the British when the war resumed after the rupture of the peace of Amiens The marbles it was carrying ended up in London where they were acquired by Lord Elgin. This metope is now in the British Museum.

After their purchase by the British Museum in 1817, the marbles were displayed in a temporary room, until the wing designed by Robert Smirke called "Elgin Room" was completed in 1832. In the 1930s, Joseph Duveen offered a new wing named the "Duveen Gallery", designed by John Russell Pope Completed in 1938, the marbles could not be placed there until after the Second World War. During the conflict, the metopes were sheltered in the tunnels of the London Underground which proved relevant since the Duveen Gallery was completely destroyed by bombing. They left their underground shelter in 1948–1949 to be relocated to the "Elgin Room", along with the rest of the marbles. They found their present location in 1962, at the end of the reconstruction of the new wing.

The southern metope X was bought at the beginning of the year 1788 from the Ottoman authorities. The acquisition was made by Louis-François-Sébastien Fauvel on behalf of his employer, the French ambassador to Constantinople, the Comte de Choiseul-Gouffier. It was the French vice-consul in Athens, Gaspari, who took charge of the negotiations. The metope was despatched in March 1788 and arrived in France the following month. However, in the summer of 1793, Choiseul-Gouffier had emigrated to Russia. He was struck by the decree of 10 October 1792 confiscating the property of the emigrants. The metope is therefore in the Louvre Museum.

Those that remained in situ throughout the nineteenth and twentieth centuries suffered the onslaught of weather and especially pollution. The metopes were removed from the building in 1988–1989 and deposited at the Acropolis Museum of Athens, along with southern XII. They have been replaced by cement mouldings on the Parthenon. South I, XXIV, XXV and XXVII to north XXXII and the fourteen metopes of the west façade are still in place, sometimes in very bad condition (West VI and VII have lost all their decor), sometimes intact (South I and North XXXII). Many fragments are in various European museums: Rome, Munich, Copenhagen (National Museum of Denmark), Wurzburg (Martin von Wagner Museum), Paris, etc. Other pieces that had been used to strengthen the southern fortification of the Acropolis in the eighteenth century have been removed since the 1980s and 1990s. These could be just as well fragments of southern metopes as north ones.

Skulpturhalle Basel offers the castings of all known metopes.

== Western metopes ==
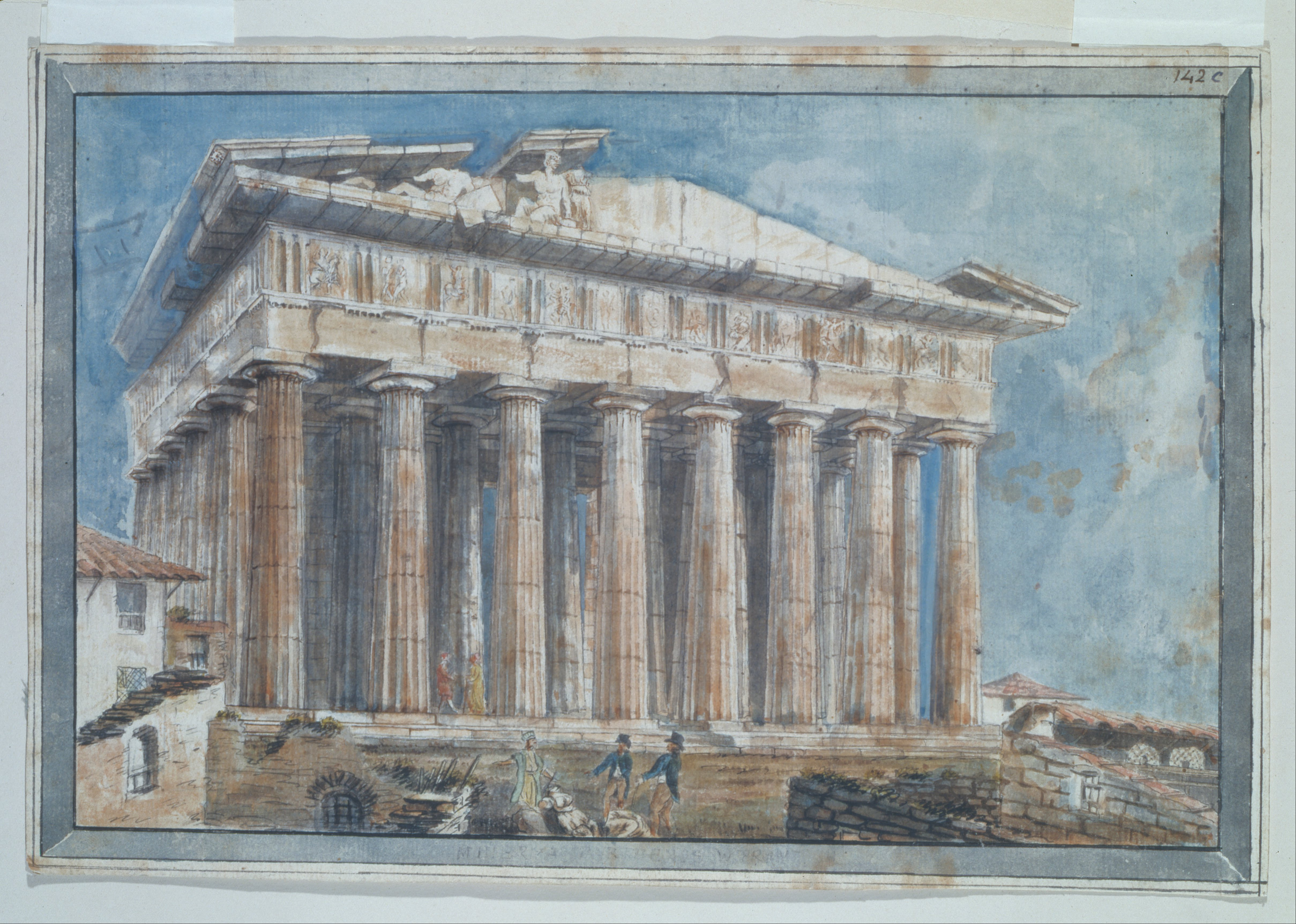
The west facade of the Parthenon, painted by William Gell with the metopes discernable under the pediment.

Metopes 3-12 of the west façade are still in place due to technical reasons, while metopes 1, 2, 13, and 14 were removed in 2012 due to pollution concerns and are on display in the Acropolis Museum. Casts of metopes 3-12 are also on display. However, the originals have suffered much damage, mainly destruction by Christians in the 6th century, such that it is difficult to determine what they represent. Thus, West VI is so damaged that it is not even possible to discern anything, and there is no cast on display in the Acropolis Museum. The painter William Pars appointed by the Society of Dilettanti to accompany Richard Chandler and Nicholas Revett during the second archaeological expedition financed by the Society, drew around 1765–1766 the western metopes I, III, IV, V, VIII to XI and XIV. His drawings show that they were in the second half of the century in a state of disrepair very close to the one we currently know.

These metopes were the ones that visitors to the Acropolis saw first: the choice of their theme was therefore essential. The most common interpretation is that it was the Amazonomachy, most probably the Athenian episode of these battles between the Greeks and the warrior women. It concerned Theseus and the Amazon Queen Antiope (sometimes called Hippolyte who, according to various accounts, would have been abducted or would have followed the Athenian hero voluntarily. The Amazons would have crossed the Bosphorus and invaded Attica to recover their sovereign. The Athenian army, led by Theseus, would have succeeded in repelling the eastern invader.

However, the subject remains controversial, largely because of the poor condition of the sculpture. Another hypothesis is that it could be a fight against the Persians. The argument has centered on the clothes of the opponents of the Greeks. Amazons are usually represented wearing a short chiton with open shoulders. But here, some wear a chlamys a hat, boots and a shield. On the other hand, these opponents of the Greeks do not wear either the trousers characteristic of the representations of the Persians. The Greeks, meanwhile, are naked (two have a chlamys, mostly fallen), with sword and shield 80,26. Whatever the hypothesis adopted, for the Athenian citizen or the foreign visitor, the obvious interpretation of this western setting was the failure of the invasion of Attica by the Persian army during the Persian war.

Two frescoes representing the Amazonomachy already existed in Athens at the time: one in the heroon of Theseus (not yet found) and the other in the Stoa Poikile attributed to Micon who included in his work Amazons on horseback. These frescoes served as an inspiration to artists for the metopes of the Parthenon, but also for the shield of the chryselephantine statue.

Each metope represents a duel between a Greek and an Amazon, around Theseus, the central figure. The Amazons were represented alternately on horseback (metopes west I, III, V, VII (?), IX, XI, XIII) victorious, and on foot (metopes west II, IV, VI (?), VIII, X, XII, XIV) vanquished. There are however three exceptions to this alternation. The western metope I only has an Amazon on horseback; on the western metope II, it seems that it is the walking Amazon who is victorious and not the Greek; on the western metope VIII, the Amazon is on horseback, but she seems to be defeated.

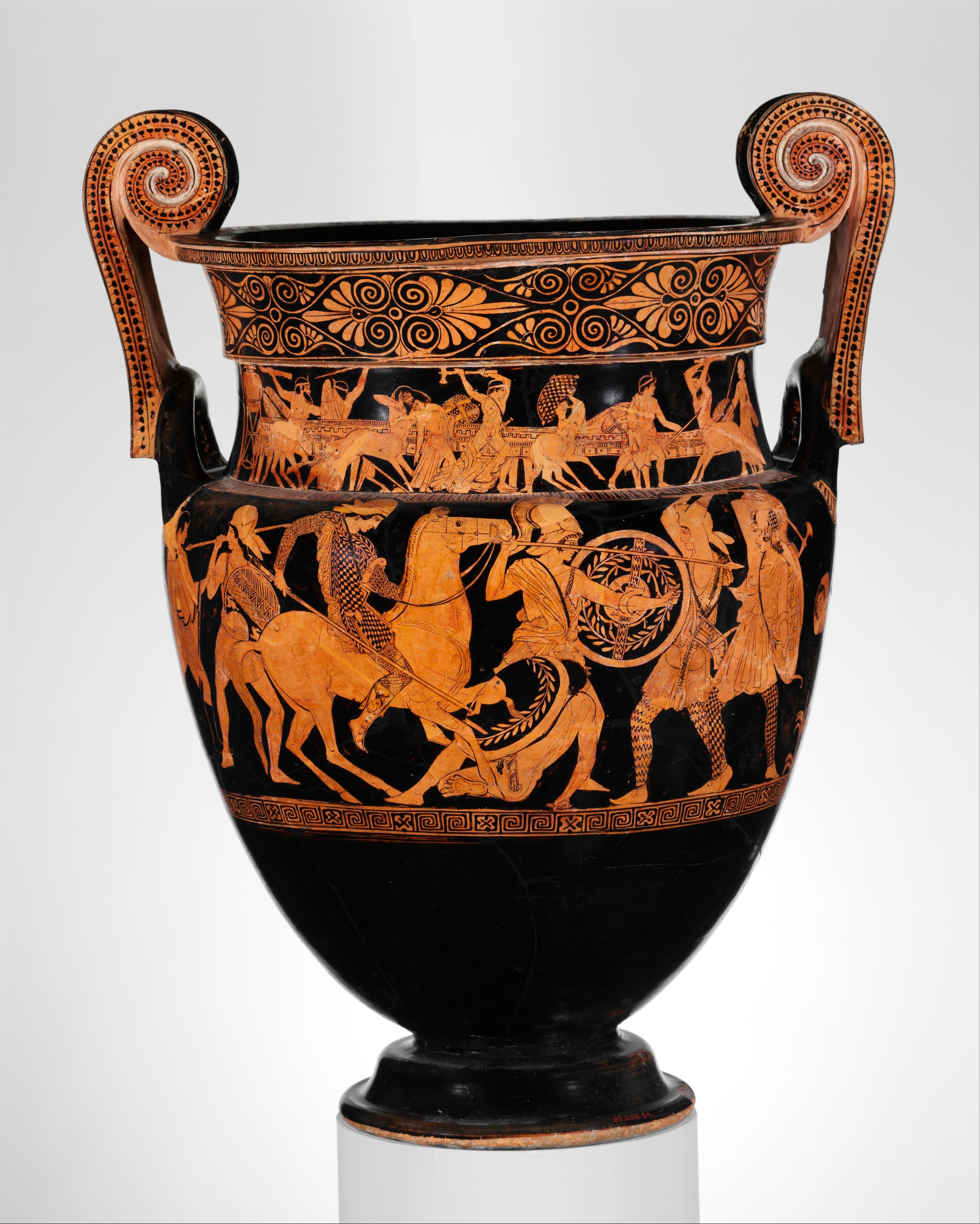
Volute krater attributed to the Painter of the Woolly Satyrs (namepiece), MET, New York, inv. 07.286.84. Depicts the Amazonomachy, and on the collar the battle of Centaurs and Lapiths.

The Amazon in western metope I is on horseback, without an adversary. This could represent the arrival of reinforcements or the rearguard. She may have had a spear, in which case her potential victim has disappeared. Margarete Bieber speculates that it could be Hippolyte herself coming to fight with the Greeks. And symmetrically, according to the American archaeologist, Theseus would find himself in West XIV. From the west metope II remains only the very damaged hips and torso of the Greek warrior on the left. He is identifiable with his round shield on his left arm. His opponent had to be dressed in a short chiton. There is a left leg and upper body left. It is possible to consider that she must have had a sword over her head, preparing to strike the Greek. The composition of the western metopes III, V, IX and XIII is similar, West V being a little more damaged, West XIII being the best preserved. An Amazon turned to the right is on horseback. Her mount tramples the naked Greek lying on the ground. The gesture she makes could be that of thrusting her spear into the body of her victim. She wears a short chiton whose hem is still discernible on West III. The defeated Greek is leaning on the left arm in west III, V and IX, and on the right arm in the west XIII. West XIII metope recalls the back of a volute krater, attributed to the Painter of the Woolly Satyrs and preserved in New York. The fallen Athenian is also found on a statue base of the fourth century BC. (Note: National Archeological Museum Athens, NM 3708) In both these two cases, vase and base of statue, the Athenian holds a shield: it could thus have one also on the metope west XIII, in marble or in bronze.

The Greek on the left on the western metope IV would have grabbed the Amazon by the hair before giving her the fatal blow, in a gesture reminiscent of that of Harmodios in the group of the Tyrannicides. Only the right leg of the Greek remains, while the other leg and his left arm can be guessed at on the bottom of the metope. There remains the hips and the bust of the Amazon, bent to the right. West metopes VI and VII are completely destroyed. At most, a ponytail can be guessed on West VII. The western metope VIII is hardly more legible; what remains has been reconstructed by Praschniker, for instance an Amazon on the left of a prancing horse; she would wear a short chiton and a floating cloak behind her. She would try to pierce with a spear her opponent. On the right, the Greek advances towards her. In the left arm, he holds a round shield that allows him to protect himself from the attack of the Amazon. Above his head, in the right hand, he holds a weapon (spear?) with which he is about to strike his enemy. This metope is almost central and does not correspond to the alternation Amazon on horse / Amazon on foot, it has been proposed to read this as the duel between Theseus and the (new) queen of the Amazons.

The western metope X is badly damaged. A silhouette can be seen on the left; she has her right knee on the ground. She seems to lift her shield, held on her left arm, to protect herself. The shape of this shield seems to be that of a pelta. It would be an Amazon on foot, defeated by a Greek. This one has totally disappeared. The horse of the Amazon on the metope west XI goes in the opposite direction (from the right to the left) of that of the equivalent metopes (west III, V, IX and XIII). He leaps over the body of the dead Greek warrior (whereas on West III, V, IX and XIII, the Athenian is going to be completed). The coat of the rider flies behind her. On the western metope XII, the Greek is identified with the trace of his round shield, to the left of the metope. There remains only one silhouette. The Amazon on the right has totally disappeared; it is only possible to guess that she is on foot.

On the western metope XIV, the fight between an Athenian on the left and an Amazon on the right seems to have come to an end. From the Greek, of which remains the hips and torso, the trace of a round shield and behind his head a fragment of marble that suggests that he could have worn a Corinthian helmet (even if he is naked elsewhere). He is sometimes identified with Theseus. The Amazon fell to her knees, perhaps held on the shoulder by her opponent. She tries to escape a fatal blow. She has her right hand resting on the belly of her enemy (gesture of supplication?); his left-hand grasps the left elbow of the Greek. The front of his short chiton was perfectly preserved in the lower right corner of the metope. A fragment above her shoulder suggests that she could wear a Phrygian helmet or cap. This metope could mean the end of the whole fight and the Athenian victory.

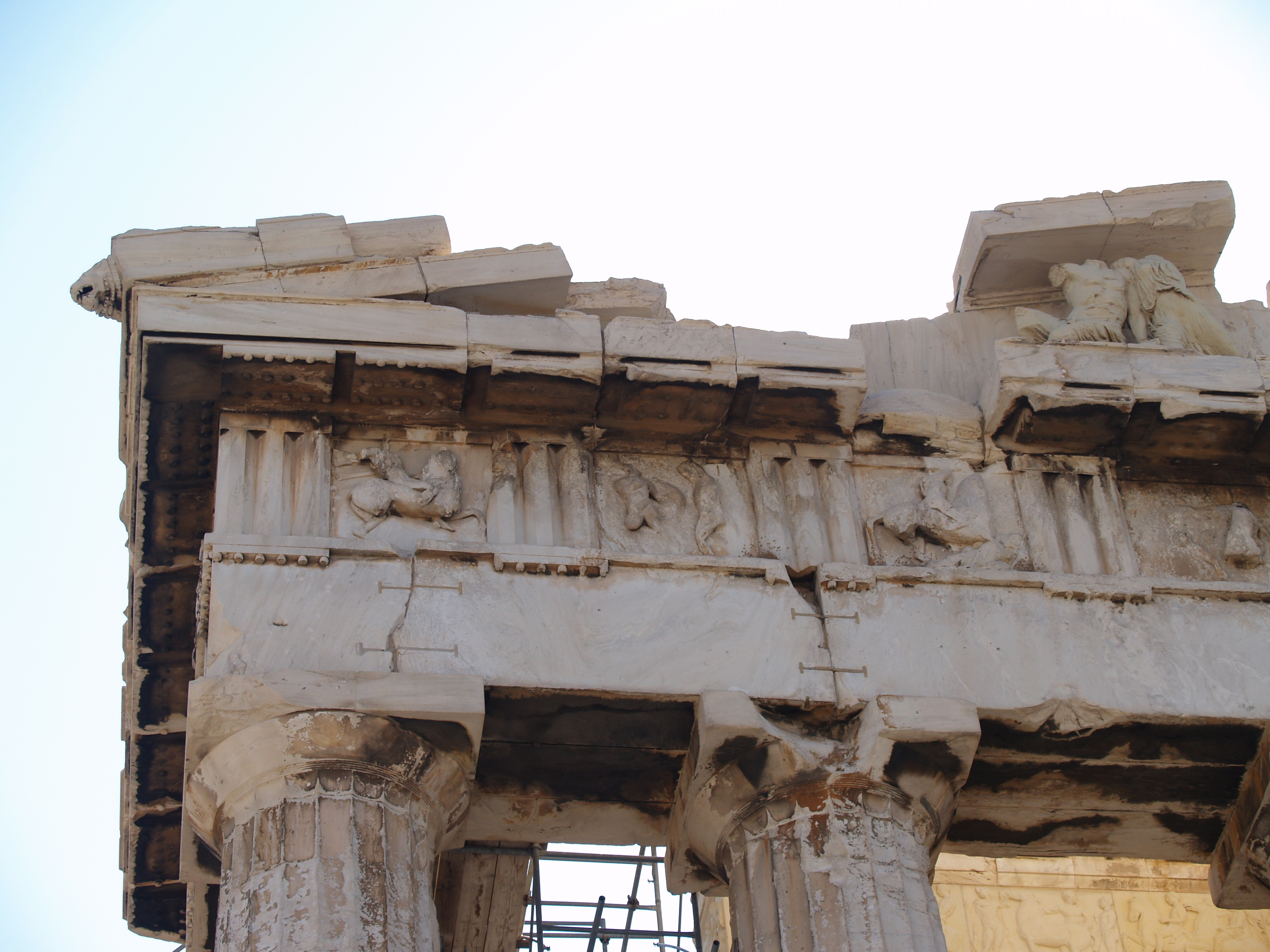
Metopes west I to IV.

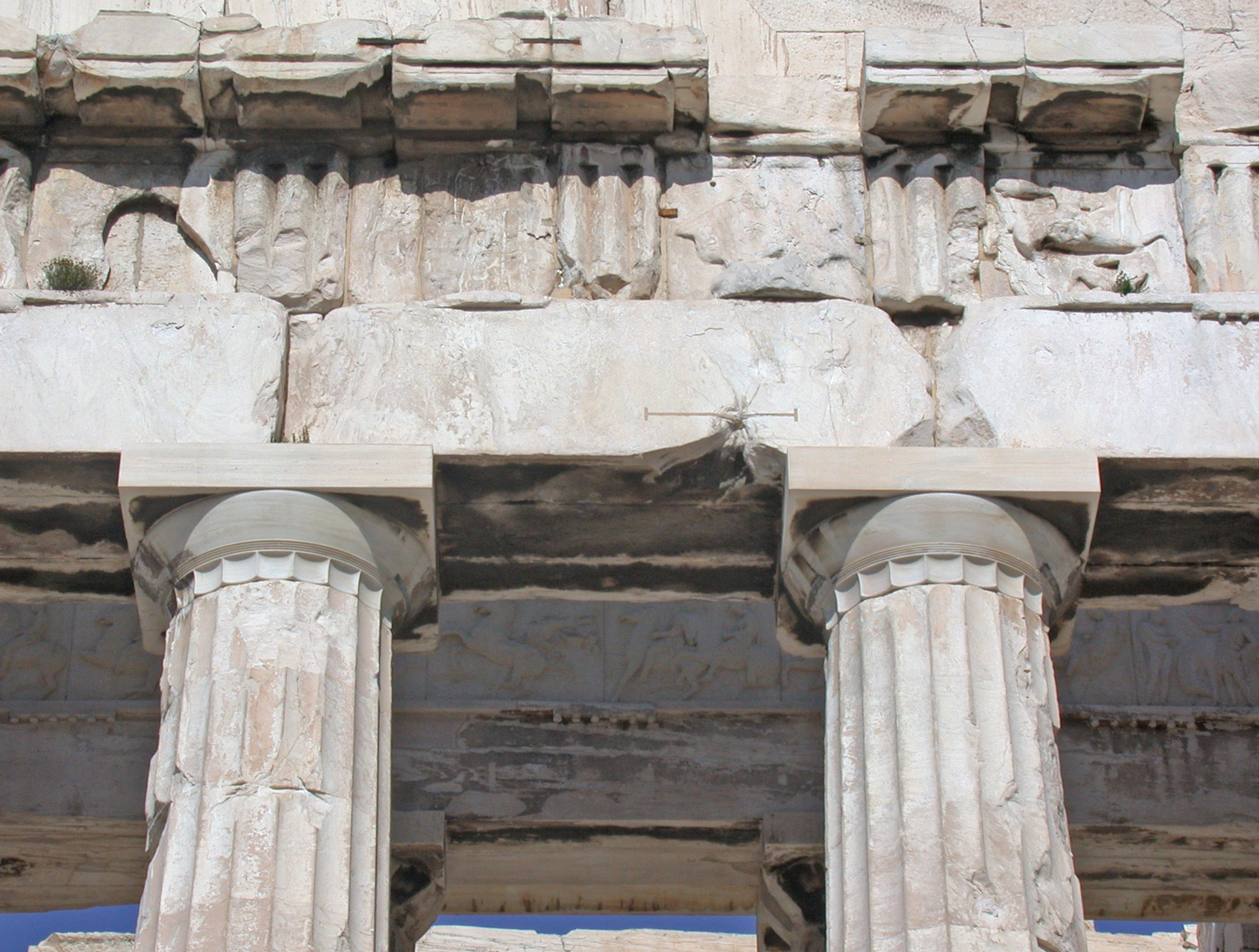
Metopes west VI, VII, VIII and IX.

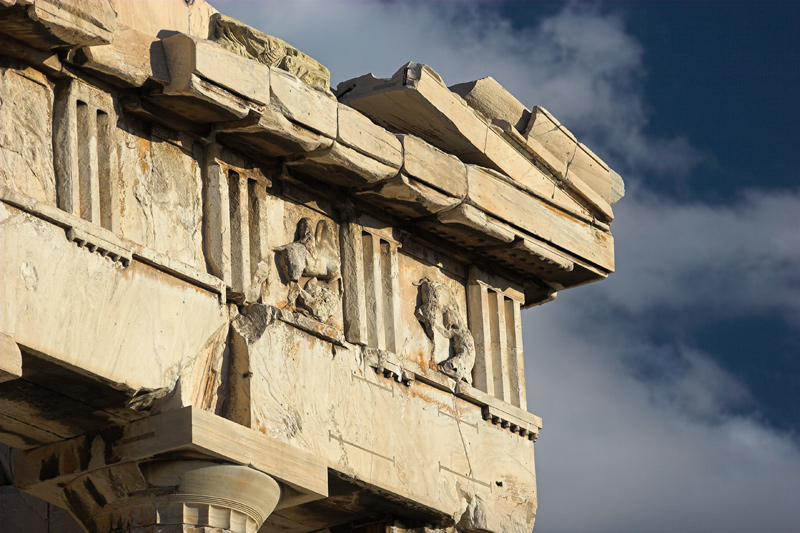
Metopes west XIII and XIV.

== North metopes ==
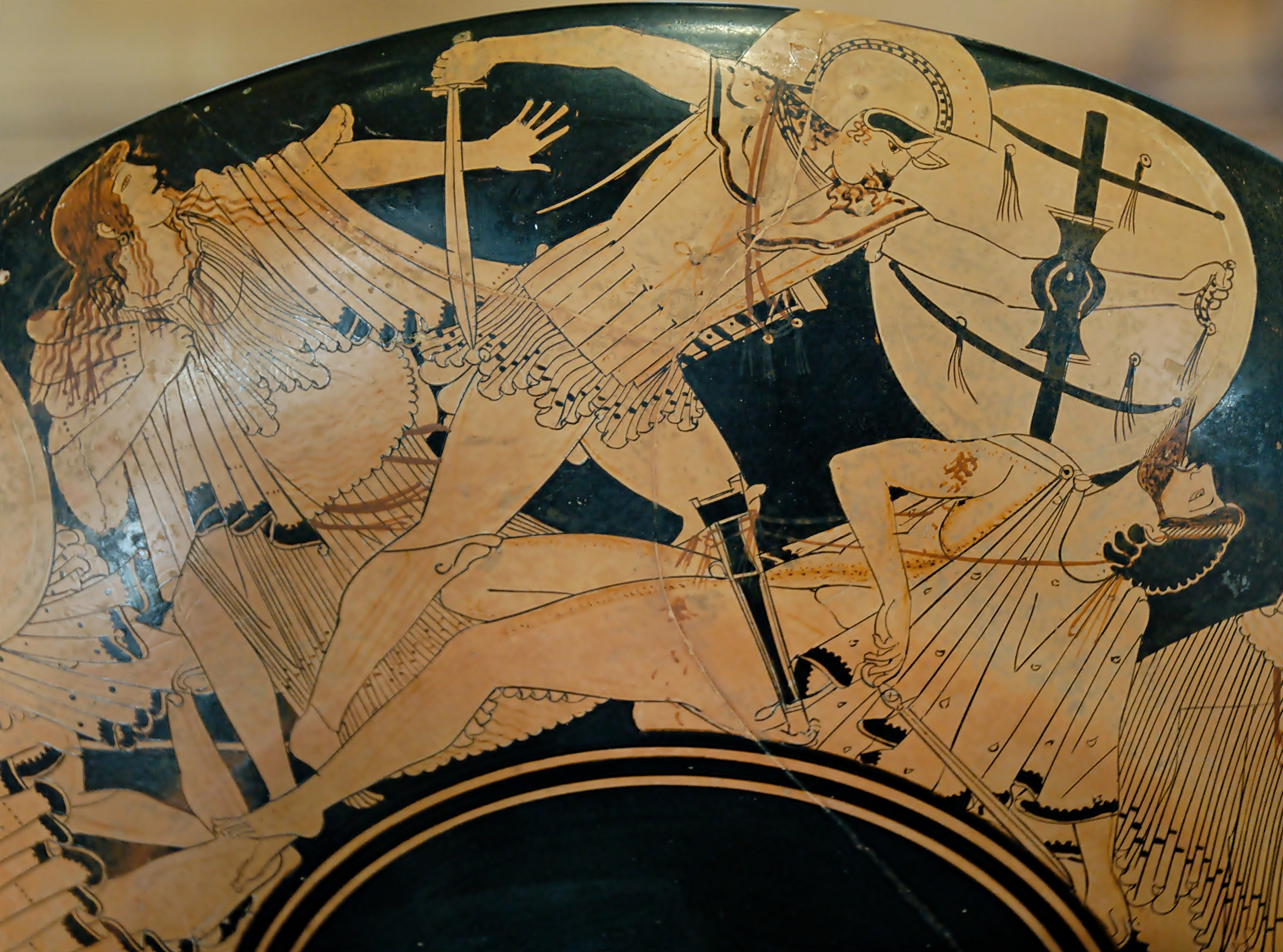
Scene of the fall of Troy, Attic kylix with red figures of the Painter of Brygos, beginning of the fifth century BC, museum of the Louvre.

Thirteen of the thirty-two north metopes (Note: North I to III, XXIII (or metope designated by the letter « D ») to XXV, XXVII to XXXII, also one designated by the letter « A » which could be V) survived the explosion of 1687, but had already been severely damaged by the destruction of Christians. The nineteen others have disappeared, but the fragments which have been found allow us to make assumptions about the subjects. Six are still in place on the building. Because of their state of preservation, it has long been difficult to determine their theme. Adolf Michaelis, in the second half of the nineteenth century suggested that the warrior on the right side of North XXIV could be Menelaus chasing Helen depicted on North XXV. On the latter, besides Helen on the right, he identified as Aphrodite the figure on the left, the two female figures being framed by a little Eros in flight on the left and a statue of Athena on the right. He based his interpretation on two texts of the seventh century BC. The Sack of Troy of Arctinos of Miletus and the Little Iliad of Lesches of Pyrrha. This hypothesis of Michaelis has suggested that the theme of metopes on the north side could be the capture of Troy, even if this theme is not taken up on the statue of Athena Parthenos. However, the fall of Troy could constitute a logical continuation to the Amazonomachy on the western metopes. The visitor to the Acropolis walks along the Parthenon on the north side, on the most obvious and easiest way (that of the Panathenae elsewhere). The two battles would then be symbolically linked, with the mythological reminder that the Amazons had chosen the Trojan camp. Moreover, the choice to situate this nocturnal episode on the north façade was to play on the light of day that touched these metopes that rarely depending on the seasons. There would then be symbolic obscurity.

The fall of Troy was the theme of two frescoes by Polygnotos which could have served as an inspiration to the sculptors of metopes: one was in Stoa Poikile and the other was in the Lesche of the Knidians at Delphi. In the latter, the number of characters mentioned by Pausanias, sixty-four, corresponds to what could be found on thirty-two metopes with two figures by metope.

Very few descriptions and identifications are certain. If all the experts seem to accept the identifications of Menelaus (north of XXIV), Helen (north of XXV) and Selene (north of XXIX), then opinions diverge for the other metopes and the whole remains the object of intense debate. The first point of contention is the ship on North II. Although everyone agrees that this is a ship, one question remains unresolved: Is it launching from the shore or mooring? In fact, everything depends on the "sense of reading" of these metopes. If they are read from left to right, from east to west (from north to north, XXXII), then they tell of the arrival of the Greeks and the taking of Troy. If they are read in the sense that visitors to the Acropolis read them along the Parthenon from the Propylaea from west to east (from North XXXII to North I), then they tell of the fall of Troy and the departure of the Greeks.

In the same way, the interpretations do not agree either on the episode narrated in the hypothesis where north II would represent the arrival of the Greeks at Troy. The metopes north I, II, III and A may represent the arrival of the Greeks at night, or the arrival of Philoctetes, or the arrival of the Myrmidons (according to the Iliad, 19, 349-424 ). The North metopes XXX to XXXII could tell of the last meeting of the gods about the fall of Troy on Mount Ida or to designate the gods as spectators of the capture of Troy, or the meeting between Zeus and Thetis on Olympus or even the birth of Pandora (in the account given by Hesiod, in his Theogony, 570-584 and The Works and Days, 54-82).

The Metope North I represents on the left a very damaged human figure: there remains a bottom of a peplos; the feet are missing and the torso is very damaged. A chariot can be seen at the knees. On the right, a horse's body without a head is clearly visible. His two left legs are still present at the bottom of the metope. It answers the metope east XIV on which is another chariot and at the end of the east pediment with the chariot of Selene. On the other hand, the deity aboard the chariot on north I is variously identified. Proponents of a story of the arrival of the Achaeans in Troy see it most often Nyx but also Eos, sometimes Selena or Athena. Proponents of a departure from the Greeks all see Helios, with the shade Hemera.

On the metope north II, do not see more than the traces of the feet of two characters and a fragment of marble suggesting their torsos. A bow and a rudder can be guessed diagonally between the two figures. Interpretations then vary: the arrival of the Greeks in Troy return of the Achaeans after their false start and their concealment behind Tenedos arrival of Myrmidons departure of the Greeks.

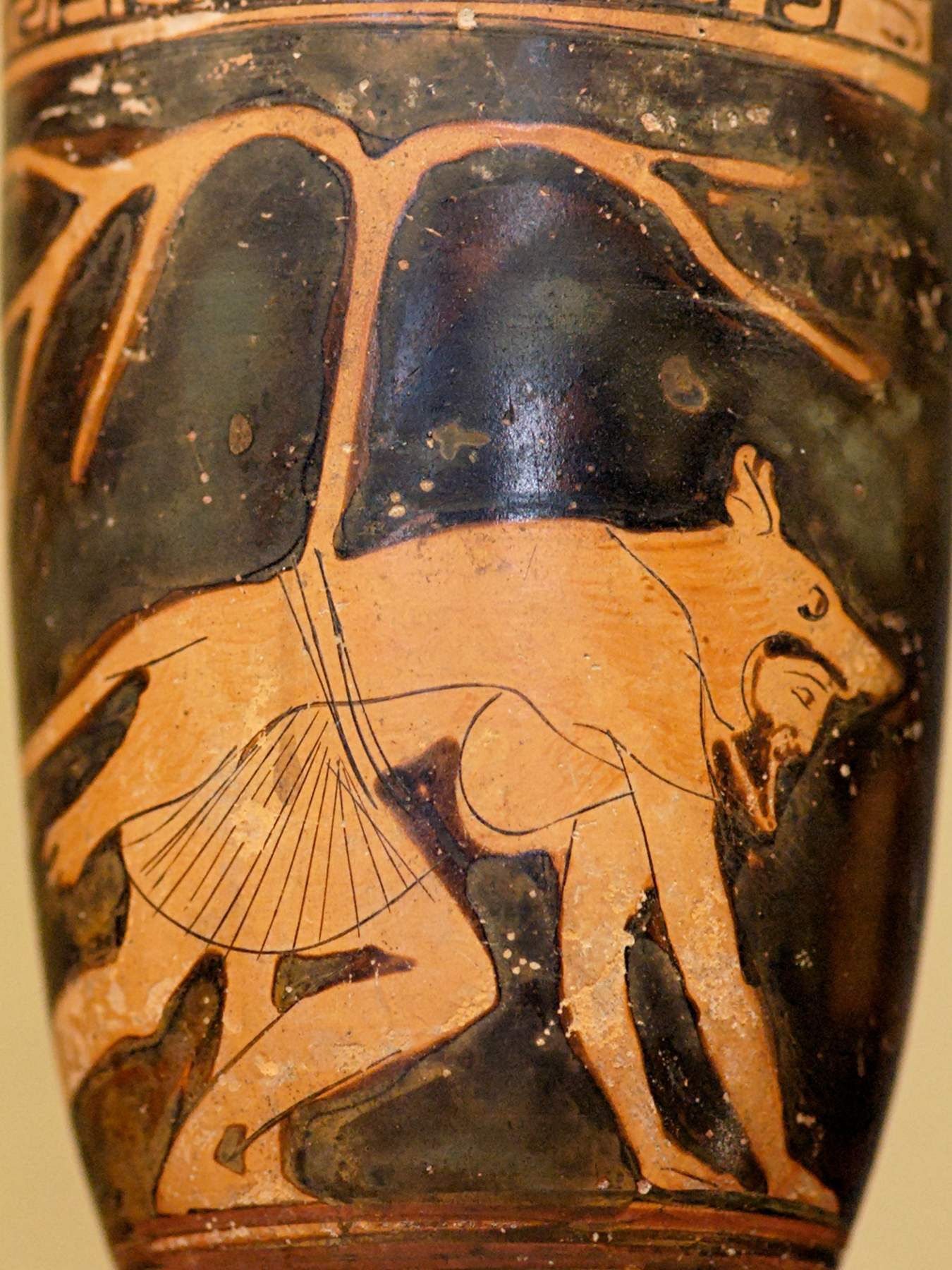
Dolon wearing his wolf skin. Lekythos with red figures. Around 460 BC, museum of the Louvre.

The North Metope III is about in the same state. We can guess at two figures: traces of the bust and an arm for the character in chiton in profile on the left; bust and round shield for the character of face to the right and nude. If all agree that these are soldiers, the identifications vary: Philoctetes and a hoplite; Philoctetes and Neoptolemus; Philoctetes without identification of the second figure; Achilles or Neoptolemus without identification of the second figure; taking up arms; Ulysses and Diomedes if we consider that the Metopes North III and IV are the story of the incursion of Dolon in the Achaean camp; disarming the Greeks before re-embarking.

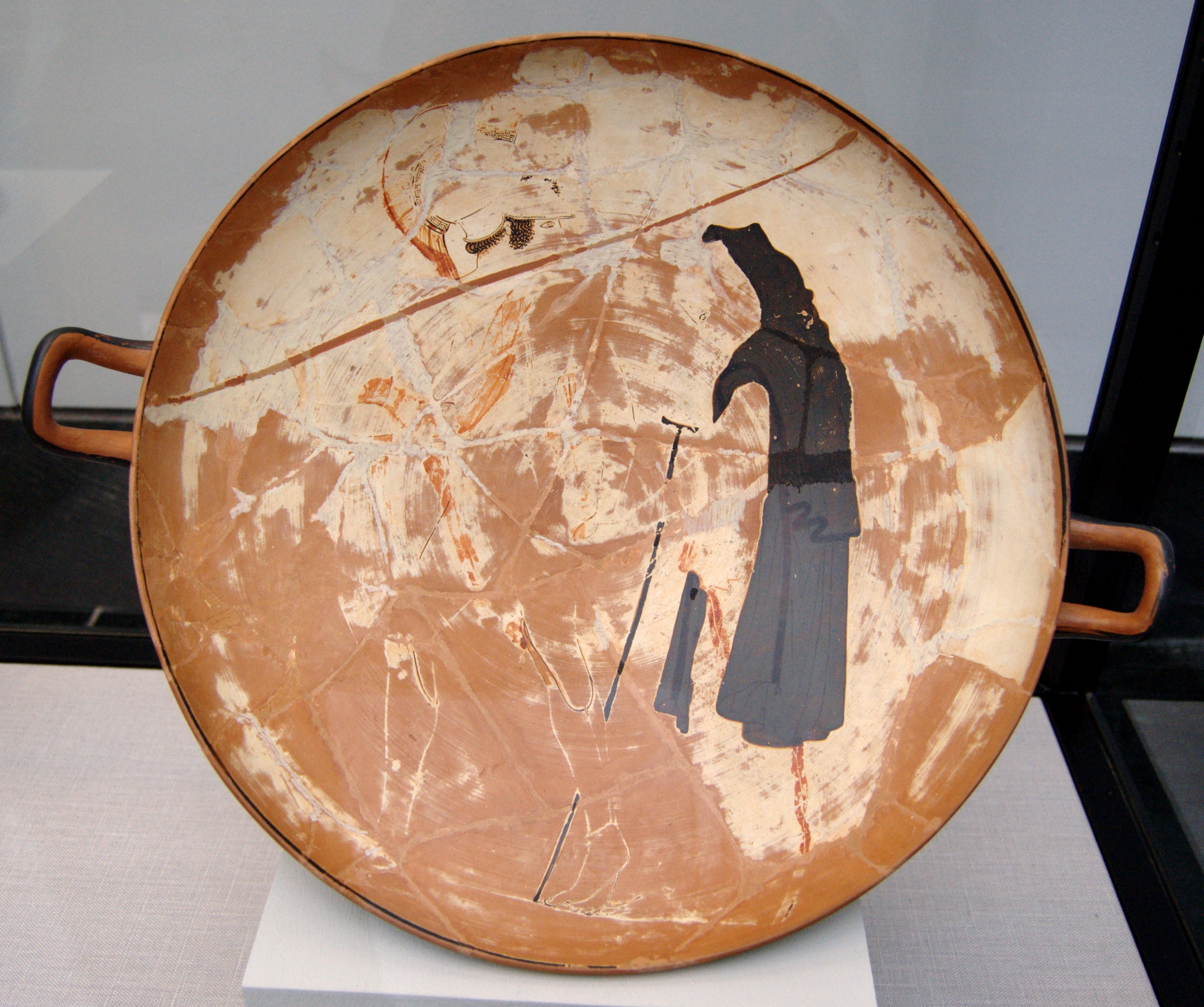
Demophon (?) Releasing Ethra, Attic kylix with a white background, 470–460 BC, Staatliche Antikensammlungen (Inv. 2687)

Of the following metopes, only fragments of more or less importance remain, the largest ones being designated by letters denoting a "quasi" -metope. Thus, the metope designated by the letter "A" (potentially north V) represents a rearing horse in the background with a human figure whose only torso and upper thighs remain in the foreground. It has therefore sometimes been confused with a southern metope belonging to the cycle of the Centauromachy. Ernst Berger, in his synthesis of the metopes of the Parthenon 78 following the great symposium of 1984 summarizes for all these metopes the different hypotheses proposed from the multiple interpretations of the fragments. The episode of the Trojan horse certainly could not be represented, for lack of space on a metope. For Metopes North IV to North VIII: the Laocoön and the Palladium Flight or a scene of sacrifice and advice of the Greeks before their departure. For north IX to north XII: around the Achilles' tomb with North IX of the Troyes or Elsewhere; in North X Polyxene and Acamas or Talthybios north XI Briseis and Agamemnon or Phoenix in the north XII Philoctetes and a Trojan hero killed by him (named Admetus or Diopeithes according to the versions of the story). Metopes North XIII to North XVI would unfold around the statue of Athena with North XIII Corèbe and Diomede; in North XIV sacrilege of Ajax (Cassandra and Ajax); in North XV of Troyennes and North XVI Hecuba. Those of North XVII to North XX would unfold around the altar of Zeus with in North XVII the death of Priam in north XVIII Astyanax and Neoptolemus in north XIX Andromache and Polites; in north XX Agenor and Lycomede or Elephenor. The following metopes would have for general theme the goddess Aphrodite with in northern XXI DEiphobe and Teucros; in the north XXII Clymene (one of Helena's maids) and Menestheus or Acamas; in North XXIII (or metope designated by the letter "D") liberation of Ethra, with Éthra and Demophon and the "reunion" between Meneleas and Helen in North XXIV and XXV114.

The north metope XXIII is most often identified with the metope designated by the letter "D". Two figures face each other. On the left, the bust (damaged), the hips and the upper thighs of a man are visible. He is naked, with a carved cloak on the bottom of the metope. He may have held a spear in his right hand. His left arm is stretched out to the right arm of the female figure on the right, who wears a peplos and has often been identified with Ethra, the mother of Theseus slave of Helen and released by Demophon son of Theseus (or his brother Acamas son of Theseus). It is also the means to insist in the setting of the Parthenon on a purely Athenian episode of the Trojan War. Another identification proposes Polyxene and Acamas or Polyxene and anonymous Greek.

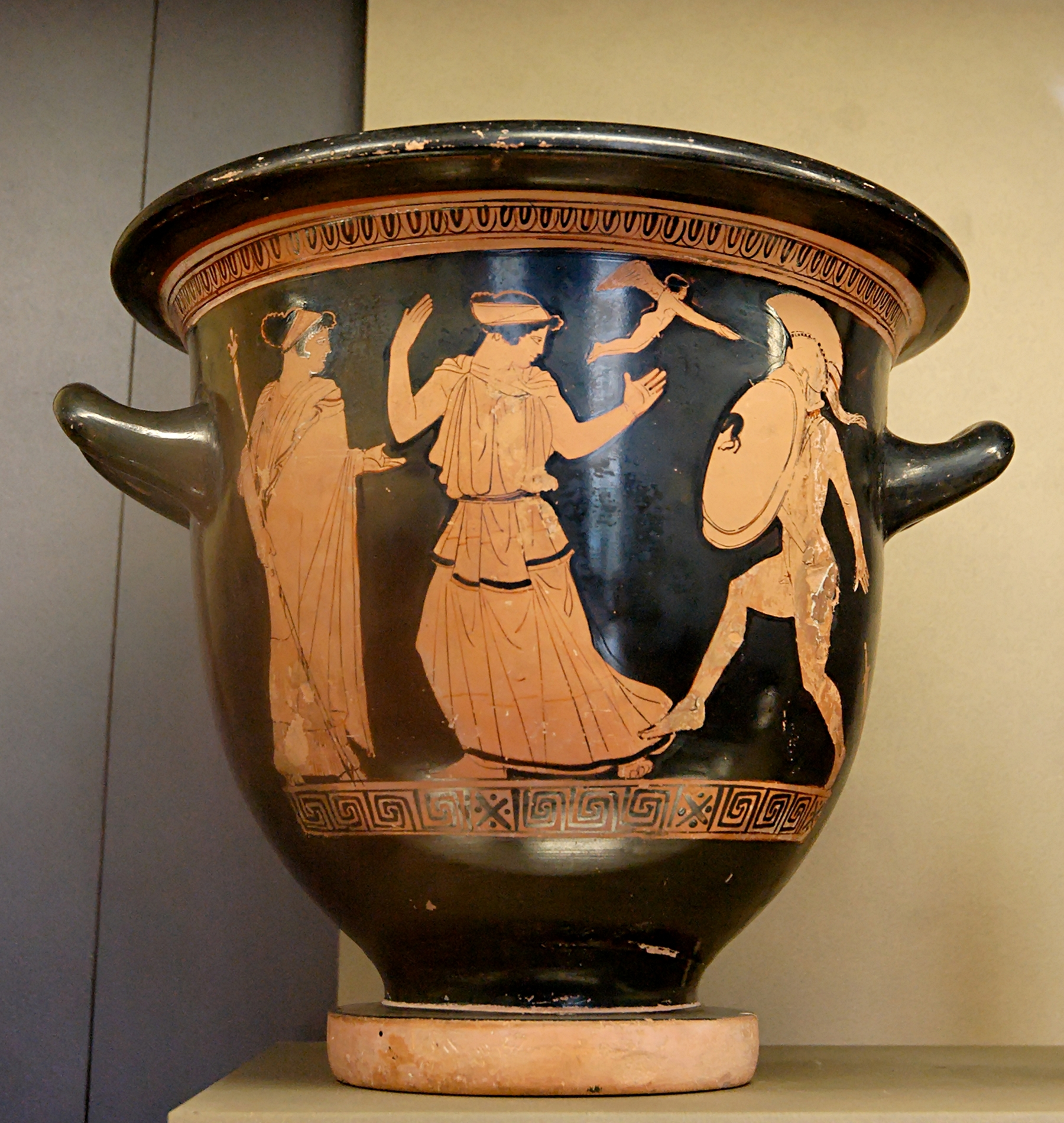
Helen saved from the anger of Menelaus by Aphrodite and Eros. Painter of Menelaus, Louvre Museum G424

Metopes North XXIV and XXV form an ensemble. On Metope North XXIV, two male profile figures walk to the right. There remains only the trunk and the upper thigh of the left warrior, naked with a cloak. Of the one on the right, also naked, there remain only the trunk and the left forearm with a shield. Menelaus (the identification accepted by all since Michaelis) advances towards the next metope from which it is separated by the triglyph. The transition marked by this purely architectural element is also a sign of the passage from outside to inside. The female figure to the left of North XXV was identified with Aphrodite by the Eros over her left shoulder. She wears a chiton and a himation. The following female figure is in peplos. She is veiled. She seems to run to the statue on the right to take refuge under her protection. Indeed, Menelaus pursued his wife to kill her, considering her responsible for the war and the death of his friends. This incident represented is the moment when Aphrodite will use his power to save his protege. She is about to open her himation to reveal her charms and her divine power. In parallel, Eros flies to Menelaus with either a phiale or a crown. The combined power of love and beauty will change the mind of Menelaus who will put down his sword and forgive his wife. This theme is very present in ceramics. The identification of the divinity completely to the right beside the statue from which Helene comes to take refuge is more difficult. An oinochoe preserved in the Vatican Museum (Etruscan Gregorian Museum) and attributed to the Painter of Heimarmene (Note: Inv. 16535) proposes an equivalent scene. On this one, Helene seeks the protection of an Athena in arms. The choice of this tutelary deity of Athens could make sense on this civic building. In addition, Athens was one of the cities claiming to have inherited the Palladium after the fall of Troy.

Metope North XXVI is totally unknown. On the north XXVII, there are two profile figures: a female, without a head, probably in peplos on the left and a male, naked with a chlamys, of which there remains only the bust, on the right. The characters walk and look to the right. The man may have carried a petasus, perhaps a shield. He may also have held the woman by the hand. The theme of this metope may remain related to Aphrodite, like the previous ones. Some interpretations propose here the issue of Ethra by her grandchildren, or a scene with Polyxena or a Trojan captive. It could also be the priestess of Athena, Theano. The fresco of Polygnotus in the Lesche of the Knidians represented her holding two of her sons by the hand, accompanied by Antenor holding one of her daughters. It could be here this family, before the Anchises family on the next metope. If this north metope XXVIII (towards which the characters walk) was the flight of Aeneas, then the female figure of north XXVII could also be Creusa.

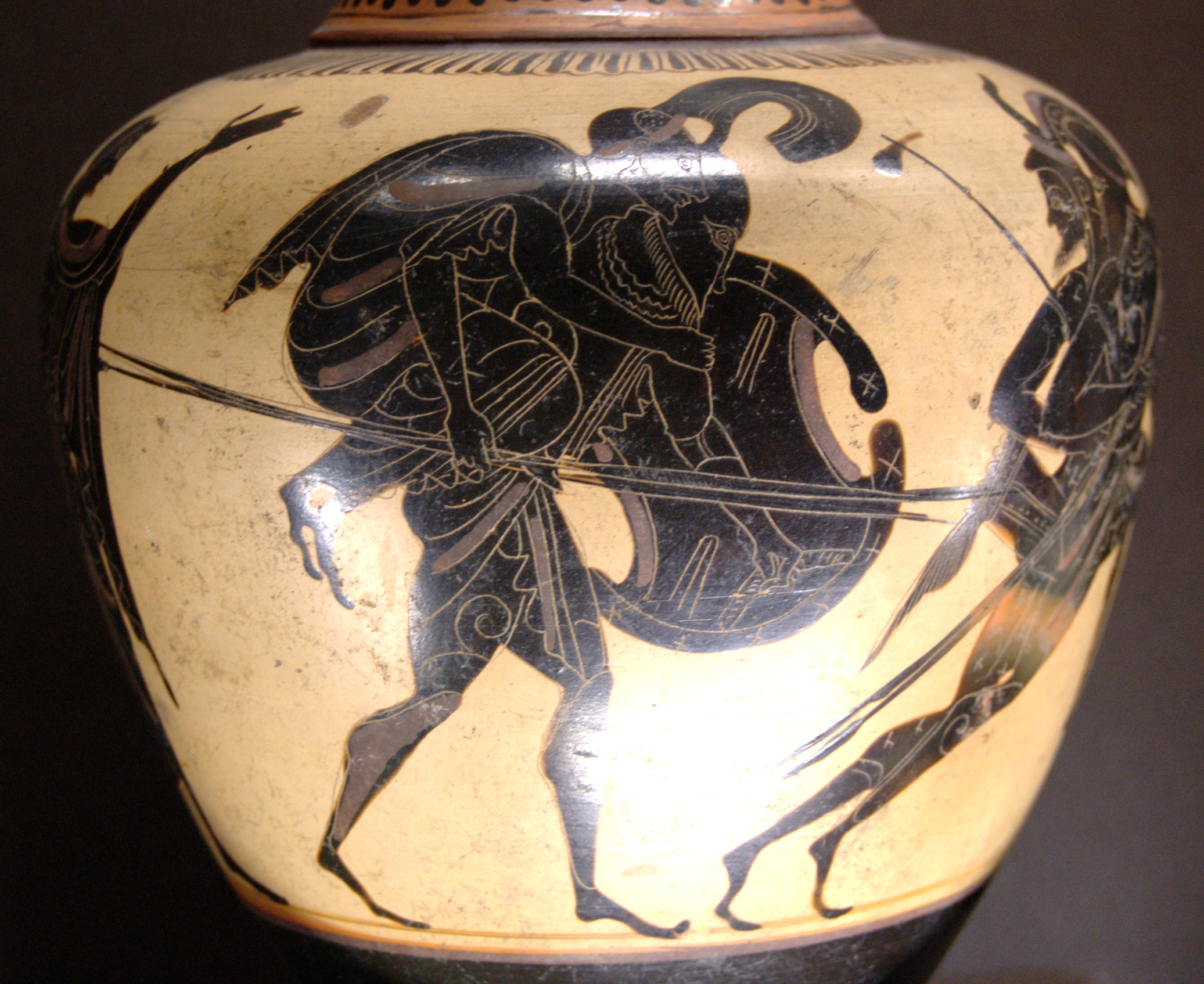
Aeneas bearing Anchises, black-figure oenochoe, c. 520-510 BC., Louvre Museum (F 118)

Metope North XXVIII is one of the most "charged", with no less than four characters. To the far left, in the foreground, is a motionless figure from the front, probably a woman: only her (missing) feet protruded from her long mantle. It is impossible to determine the gesture of his arms. At his immediate right and a little behind, another figure, considered an old man, is in profile turned to the male figure on his right. He wears a short-sleeved garment and a coat that leaves his right shoulder unobstructed. His two hands are resting on the shoulders of the next figure on the right. This is a naked man in a coat that goes down his back and between the legs. In the left arm, he carries a large round shield that protrudes above his head. The man walks to the right. In front of him, a last figure, probably male, smaller, in a coat. The most common interpretation for the three male figures is Anchises on the shoulders of his son Aeneas, himself preceded by his own son Ascagne. The female figure is therefore most often considered as Aphrodite (general theme of this series of metopes, but also mother of Aeneas). Sometimes she is identified as Cretace, the wife of Aeneas.

A rider can be discerned on the Metope North XXIX, also marked by a decoration of rocks. The horse, perhaps a mare, is turned to the right, head down. The rider, rather a rider, seems to ride "amazon"?, the left arm resting on the neck of the mare. The rider is facing to the right. She has to wear a chiton. His right hand was to hold his veil. In the upper right corner is a slightly curved relief fragment, interpreted as a crescent moon. The rider would then be Selene. However, as it is not represented on horseback, it could also be the Pleiade Electre.

There is almost nothing left of the metope north XXX, except on the bottom two traces of busts, perhaps two male figures. If we consider their location, between a celestial deity in North XXIX and Zeus and Hera in North XXXI and XXXII, then it could be gods, perhaps Apollo and Ares or Hermes; the three were, in effect, absent until then metopes north. Metope North XXXI is better preserved. The figure on the left is a man in a nude profile in a long coat?, sitting on a rock, an elbow resting on a thigh. The figure on the right is more in the foreground, from the front. It is thin with very visible wings down to the ground. The two figures are identified, in connection with the next metope, to Zeus and Iris, sometimes Eris or Nike.

The only well preserved, and still in situ, metope on this north side is North XXXII. In 1933, Gerhart Rodenwaldt suggested (Note: « Interpretatio Christiana », Archäologischer Anzeiger, 3/4, 1933.) that it could have been read by Christians as an Annunciation and thus preserved while its position in the northwest made it very visible. Two female figures face each other. One on the right is seated and the other on the left is walking towards her. The female figure on the left wears an "Attic" peplos and makes the gesture of removing her cloak, with the left arm above the head and right along the thigh: the movement of the garment is very well made. It is found on a depiction of Apollo on a white-tailed skyphos preserved at the Boston Museum of Fine Arts. (Note: Attributed to the Painter of Karlsruhe, inv. 00-356.) The seated figure is in chiton, covered with a long mantle, which allows a work of sculpture on the drapes bunk. The right elbow is supported on the right knee; the legs are shifted: the left lower than the right. The left hand (disappeared, like the whole arm) was leaning behind, on the rock, placing the figure of three-quarters. It is possible that the left arm was added after carving, as suggested by the fixation hole.

The most common interpretation for this Metope North XXXII is that to the left is Athena and to the right of Hera or sometimes Themis, Aphrodite, Cybele, or even another unidentified female deity. Kristian Jeppesen in 1963 suggests that it could be Pandora on the left and Aphrodite on the right. Katherine A. Schwab disputes in an article of 2005 the identification of Athena on the left. One of the main arguments in favour of Athena is that she is not or perhaps not identified elsewhere on this side unless, according to K. Schwab, she is on the metope North I, aboard the chariot. Indeed, this one seems to be braking, it can not be the chariot of one of the two stars. The second argument in favour of an identification of Athena is that she would carry the aegis on the chest. The counter-argument of K. A. Schwab is that what is interpreted as the aegis would in fact be a very damaged place of the metope. Finally, for K. Schwab, in her movement, her peplos open and revealing her bare leg, something impossible for a virgin goddess like Athena. It could then be Hebe, from the moment she is put in relation with the seated female figure?. This one is considered as Aphrodite or Hera. However, as Aphrodite is prominently on north XXV, she can not be as far north as XXXII. Moreover, on north XXXI, the male figure sitting would be Zeus. Therefore, in North XXXII, could be Hera, in a symbolic hierogamy. The winged figure next to Zeus in northern XXXI would be Iris, so the female figure walking north XXXII would be Hebe. The latter being linked to marriage and renewal, these two North Metopes XXXI and XXXII could mean the renewal of their vows by the divine couple Zeus-Hera, just as the marriage Menelaus-Helen is renewed in the North XXIV and XXV.

== East metopes ==
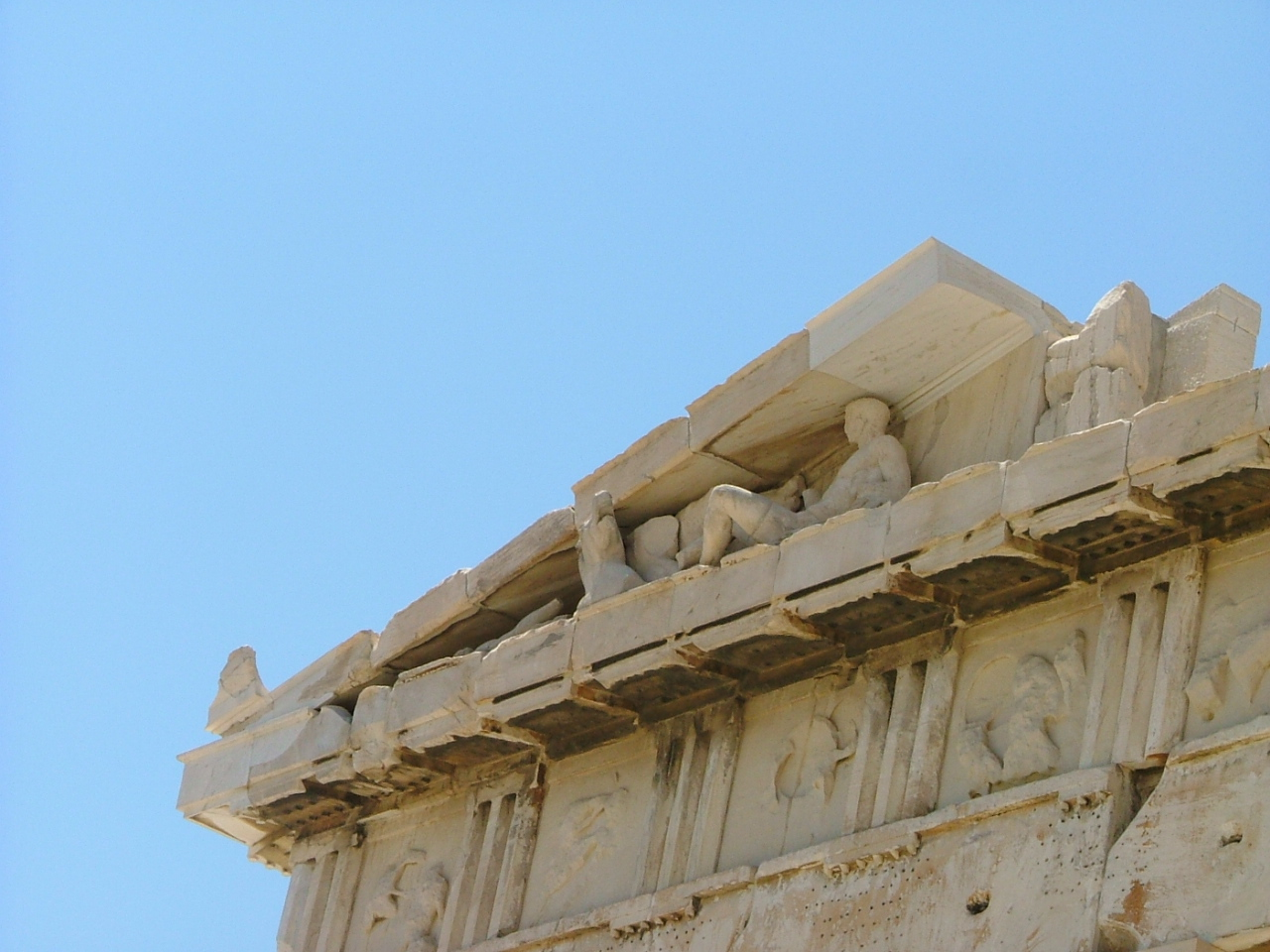
Metopes east I to V.

Since these metopes have been almost completely destroyed by Christians, it is difficult to know what they represented. However, in the nineteenth century, Adolf Michaelis suggested that the character on east II could be a Dionysus (identified thanks to the panther and snake that accompany him) attacking a giant on the run. Michaelis then made the hypothesis that the metopes on this façade could represent Gigantomachy. Therefore, the identification of other figures was possible, even if some are still debated. The work was done by comparison with other representations of gigantomachy: Athenian vases of the fifth century BC., the Siphnian Treasury or the Pergamon Altar However, these metopes were a turning point in the representation of the giants. Until the middle of the fifth century BC, they were represented as hoplites. Here, and in later representations, as in Pergamum, they are naked or simply dressed in animal skins.

The figures of the metopes east V, VII, X and XIV are not opposed to a giant, but stand in a chariot. For this reason, they are sometimes identified not with a deity but with the charioteer of the chariot of divinity. The vehicle is turned towards the center of the façade. The east metopes are organized symmetrically around a central axis, the same as for the eastern frieze and the as with the east pediment; moreover, the identifications are sometimes made by comparison with the divinities present in parallel on these two other decorative elements of the Parthenon. The four central metopes (east VI, VII, VIII and IX) are framed by two metopes with a chariot (east V and X) then the two metopes with three characters (east IV and XI). This composition would evoke the end of the fight and the imminent victory of the Olympians; the place of the confrontation would no longer be the plain of Phlegra but already the slopes of Olympus.

Identifications of the Gods
Metope	According to Michaelis 1871	According to Petersen 1873	According to Robert 1884	According to Studniczka 1912	According to Praschniker 1928	According to Brommer 1967	According to Tiverios 1982	According to Schwab 2005
East I	?	Hermes or Ares	Hermes	Hermes	Hermes	Hermes	Hermes	Hermes
East II	Dionysos	Dionysos	Dionysos	Dionysos	Dionysos	Dionysos	Dionysos	Dionysos
East III	Ares	Poseidon	Ares	Ares	Ares	Ares	Hephaistos	Ares
East IV	Hera, Demeter or Artemis	Athena	Hera	Athena and Nike	Athena and Nike	Athena and Nike	Athena and Nike	Athena and Nike
East V	Figure on a chariot	Nike driving the chariot of Athena presents on the previous metope.	Iris or Nike leading Zeus' chariot present on the next metope.	Amphitrite	Amphitrite	Demeter	Amphitrite	Amphitrite
East VI	Poseidon	Heracles	Zeus	Poseidon	Poseidon	Male god	Poseidon and Polybotes	Poseidon
East VII	?	Iris driving the chariot of Zeus present on the next metope.	Aglaurus driving the chariot of Athena present on the next metope.	Hera	Hera	Hera	Hera	Hera
East VIII	?	Zeus	Athena	Zeus	Zeus	Zeus	Zeus	Zeus
East IX	Apollo ?	Hera	Heracles	Apollo	Apollo	Heracles	Apollo	Apollo
East X	Artemis ?	Leto driving the chariot of Apollo present on the next metope.	Iolaos (?) leading the chariot of Heracles present on the next metope.	Aphrodite	Artemis	Aphrodite	Artemis	Artemis
East XI	?	Apollo	Apollo	Eros	Heracles and Eros	Apollo and Eros	Ares and Eros	Heracles and Eros
East XII	Demeter or Artemis	Artemis	Artemis	Artemis	Aphrodite	Artemis	Aphrodite	Aphrodite
East XIII	?	Ares	Poseidon	Hephaistos	Hephaistos	Hephaistos	Heracles	Hephaistos
East XIV	?	Nyx	Amphitrie	Sun god or sea god	Helios	Poseidon	Helios	Helios

Two male figures are on the metope east I. The one on the left carries a chlamys; with her right hand, she seems to hold the right figure with her knees on the ground. With her left hand, she is about to strike a fatal blow. His sword was, given the fixing hole, to be a bronze object. The figure on the right bears a skin of animal and has the right hand resting on the hip of his adversary, perhaps to ask for grace. Thus Hermes is represented on the amphora of the Gigantomachy by the Suessula Painter conserved in the Louvre. (Note: S 1677.) Moreover, on the frieze of the Parthenon, on the east side, it is Hermes which is also completely on the left. On the metope east II, the divine figure of Dionysus is quite easily identifiable. In the foreground, an animal leaps between the figure on the left that is attacking and the one on the right that is leaking. The hind legs of the animal are feline legs. Fixing holes could also mean the presence of a bronze snake. Moreover, on the Parthenon frieze, on the east side, Dionysus is immediately to the right of Hermes. Finally, it is also on the left side of the eastern pediment. On the metope east III, very damaged, is guessed a round shield, between two figures of which there are only a few traces. The shield deity is most often identified with Ares: it is the third male deity on the east side of the frieze and is present on the left side of the eastern pediment.

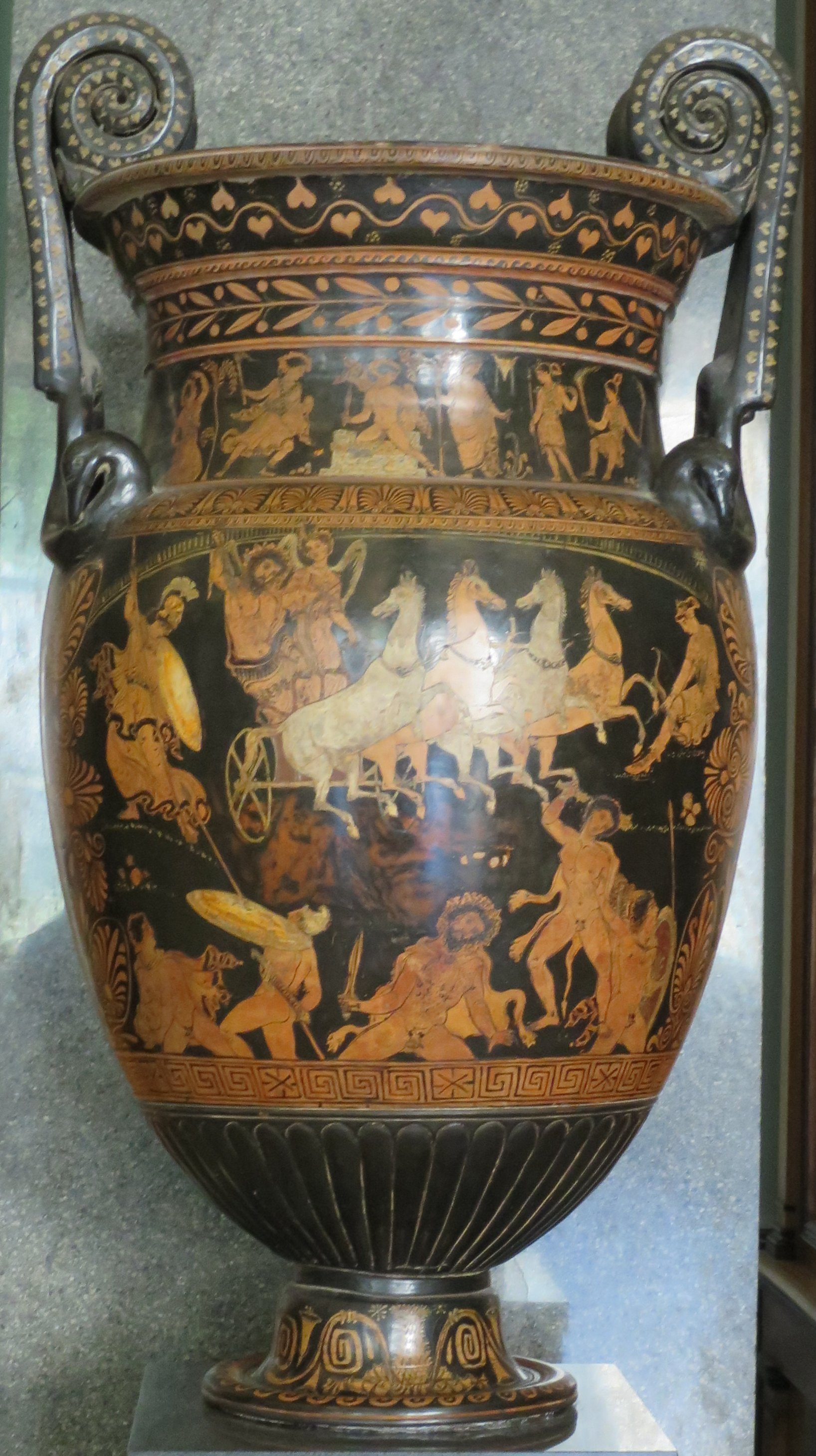
Gigantomachy, Lycurgus painter, crater, around 350 BC., Hermitage Museum.

The general shape of the characters on east IV is still discernible. It has three figures. On the left, a fallen figure protects himself with his shield from the attack of a female figure. Behind it, to the far right is a smaller figure in flight. It seems that Athena is the central figure; she would walk to the left, her left arm protected from her shield with the aegis. In the right hand, she would hold a spear (added bronze object) which she would hit a giant, already on the ground and protecting himself with his own shield. At the top right, there is the little figure of Nike crowning the goddess. An equivalent composition is visible on the amphora attributed to the painter of Suessula preserved in the Louvre. The Athena crowned by Nike is the sign of the upcoming victory of the gods, but also a tribute and a glorification of the city of Athens and its citizens, as on the entire building.

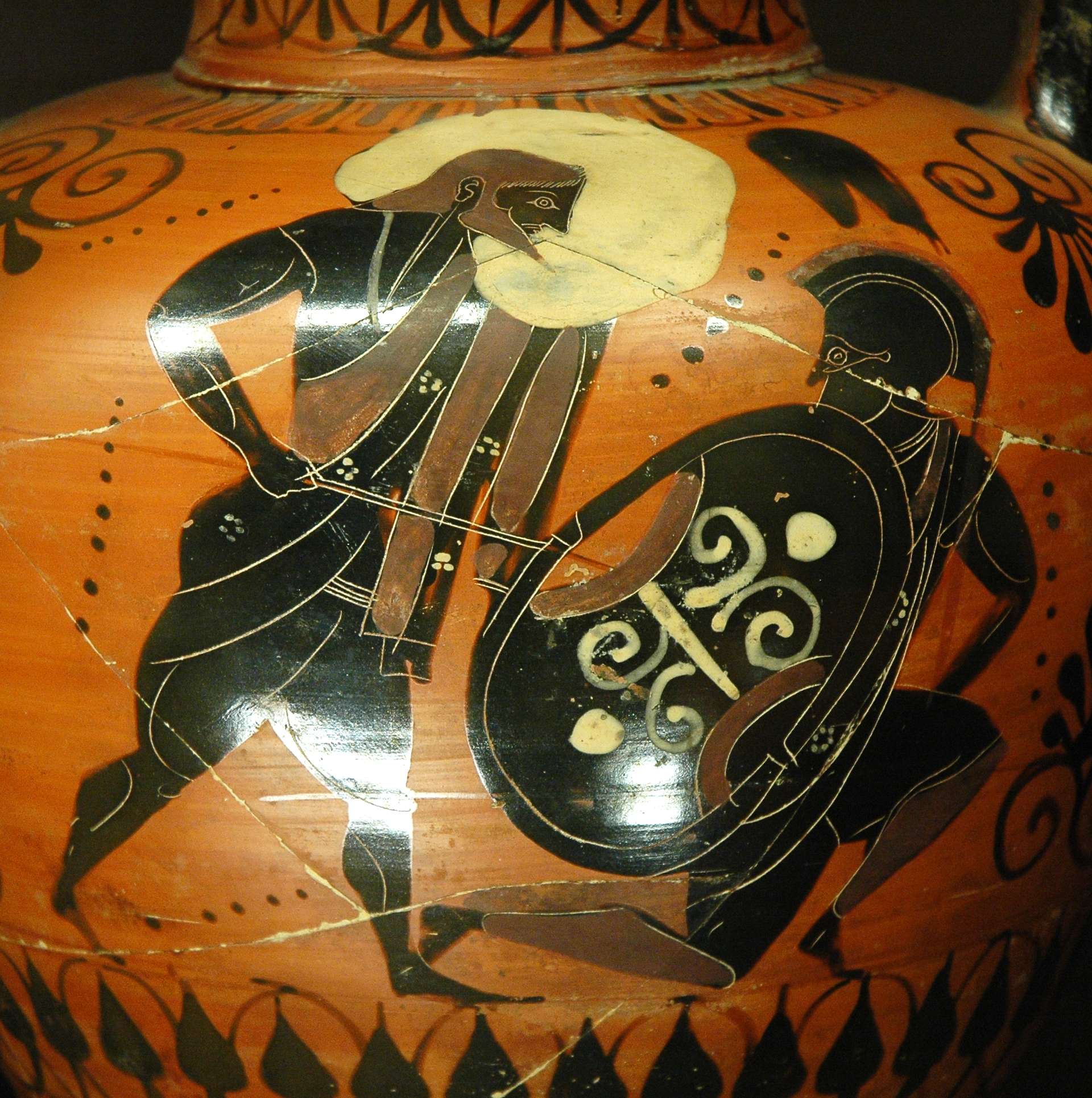
Poseidon confronting Polybotes during the Gigantomachy. Attic amphora, black figure; Louvre F226.

On the metope east V can be seen a chariot, turned to the right and pulled by two horses. The two main interpretations are Demeter or Amphitrite. It is the latter that is most often suggested since it is considered that Poseidon appears on the next metope 144. The essential element of the metope east VI is a huge rock, both landscape element and weapon used by Poseidon against a giant: it would be the episode taking place between the god and Polybotes, in which the rock ripped off. on the island of Cos would have given birth to the new island of Nisyros?. The outlines of the characters are barely discernible. The giant would protect himself from his shield while Poseidon would crush his head with Nisyros. The composition is reminiscent of a crater fragment preserved in Ferrara. (Note: Museo Nazionale di Spina, T. 3000 (inv. 2892)) and attributed to the Pélée painter who was inspired by the metope, as well as an attic bas-relief from the fourth century BC now at the Metropolitan Museum of Art. (Note: Inv. 29.47)

The metope east VII again represents a chariot, pulled by two winged horses. The most common interpretation is Hera, since Zeus is identified on the next metope. Moreover, the divine couple is represented together in the centre of the frieze as well as the pediment. The metope is VIII is extremely damaged: a bust is guessed on the left and a shield is discerned in the upper right quarter. The bottom of a chiton is engraved on the bottom of the metope under the bust. The identification of Zeus is justified by the central place of the metope on the east façade. At the same time, the god is also in the centre of the frieze and pediment. On the metope east IX, the figure on the left is probably a giant, holding in his right hand a club or a bronze torch (added given the hole of fixation). His right arm is protected from an animal skin. His opponent enters his right knee in the thigh(?). The position of the god's right arm, which would hold a sword, is not unlike that of Harmodios in the group of Tyrannicides. The identification of Apollo is again related to the frieze and pediment where the god is on the right side. The metope east X again shows a chariot pulled by two horses. On the frieze, the neighbours of Apollo are Artemis and Aphrodite, the two main propositions for the charioteer of this chariot. If one is identified as X, then the other is suggested for east XII, and vice versa. On the metope east XII, a female figure on the left walks to the right. She wears a peplos and her coat hangs from her left arm. There is too little of the giant (bust and head fragment) to determine anything. Here again, Artemis and Aphrodite are proposed, without being able to decide, especially since Eros is identified on the metope east XI, between the two. Finally, these two goddesses are sitting next to Apollo on the frieze. If Artemis is immediately on the right of his brother, Eros is also on the right of his mother, thus depriving us of a decisive rubric.

The other metope with three characters is located in XI. On the right, a giant fell to his knees. The central figure was so high in relief that it disappeared. The identification of this central character is still debated. On the left is a smaller figure (a youth?). The fixing holes on his shoulder and hip are reminiscent of the presence of a quiver, which would identify him as Eros. His presence is linked to that of Aphrodite (on the previous metope or the next). Tiverios then makes the link Eros-Aphrodite to propose Ares as identification of the central figure. Another identification proposed is Apollo, in connection with IX: if Heracles is present in IX, then Apollo is on XI, and vice versa. Indeed, Heracles is also suggested: he is regularly associated with Eros which he was the "pedagogue". Another argument is the symmetry between this metope and the metope is IV. If Athena is present in is IV, then her protege Heracles is certainly in is XI. There remains almost nothing of the metope is XIII: on the left a shoulder, a bust and the hips of a figure visibly fallen to the ground; on the right one shoulder, the bust and the traces of one thigh and one leg of a figure dominating the other, probably preparing to crush it with a rock. It is most often Héphaïstos that is proposed.

Two horses leap diagonally from right to left on the metope east XIV. In the bottom right corner, next to a calf, a fish is very clearly visible, hence the suggestion that sometimes the god of the chariot would be Poseidon. However, Helios is a more common proposition. According to the account of Pseudo-Apollodorus, (Note: Bibliothèque, 1.6.1 à 1.6.3) Zeus stopped the march of the Sun and the Moon to allow Athena to go to Heracles to Hades, the presence of the hero being necessary for the victory. This episode would be according to Katherine A. Schwab in east IV and east XI, the only metopes with three characters and not two. East XIV, with the chariot of Helios coming out of the ocean, would be the expression of the resumption of the march of time. Moreover, it responds to the metope north I, on which is represented a chariot, perhaps that of Athena, and at the end of the eastern pediment with the chariot of Selene.

== South metopes ==
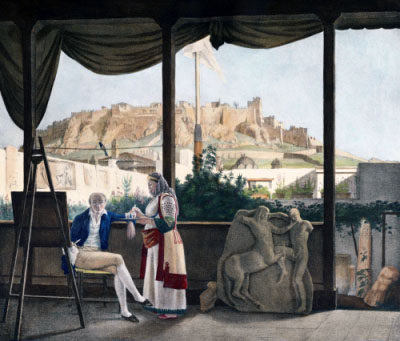
In 1819, Louis Dupré represented Louis-François-Sébastien Fauvel at home; on the right of the painting, a plaster cast of the metope south XXXI (destroyed with the house in 1825).

On this side of the Parthenon, the preserved metopes represent the Centauromachy (battle between Greeks and Centaurs) (Note: Ovid, Métamorphoses, 12.210-535) probably at the time of the marriage of the king of Thessaly Pirithoos with Hippodamia. Centaurs and Lapiths are cousins (Lapiths and Centaurs were half-brothers, sons of Apollo), hence the invitation of the Centaurs who descended from Pelion for the occasion. The effects of alcohol being felt, the Centaurs attempted to carry off the women, including Hippodamia. The Lapiths came to their aid, seizing all that was within their reach could serve as weapons, and the fight took such proportions that it continued outside. It is the fact that women are present in this centauromachy (as also on the west pediment of the temple of Zeus in Olympia) that identifies this specific episode, although it seems that some guests came with their shield, even throw them at the wedding. The presence of this theme on an Athenian building celebrating the city is however not surprising: Theseus was the best friend of Pirithoos and was present at the ceremony and during the fight. According to Pausanias, a fresco by Mikon, in the hero of Theseus (not yet found), dating back to around 470 BC., already evoked this episode. This fresco greatly influenced the painters on vases, and certainly the sculptors of the metopes of the Parthenon. Unlike the other sides, the Centaurs are not barbarians: they are from the Greek world. In addition, the sculptors of metopes have renewed the way of representing them. They made sure to remove the strangeness of the double nature, as it had been the case until then. The animal and human parts are not autonomous, but are well connected and functional. This is therefore a fight between Greeks; between humans and centaurs who are also closer to the human than the monster. The metopes could be a metaphor for the conflicts that then pitted the Greeks against each other. This theme of the centauromachy can be read at another level for Athenian citizens. The behavior of the centaurs who do not respect the sanctity of the wedding ceremony could echo the sacrilege of the Persians when they destroyed the shrines of the Acropolis.

These metopes are both the best preserved and the most fully destroyed. The best preserved are those ends that were taken to London by Lord Elgin, which preserved them completely, in comparison with those of the other sides remained on the building. However, the central metopes (South XIII to XXI) have also completely disappeared in the explosion of the powder magazine in 1687. Only the drawings attributed to Jacques Carrey, dating from 1674, remain. On these drawings there is no Centaur, which leads to a problem of interpretation of the general theme on this side. Fragments found during recent excavations on the Acropolis illuminated a little more.

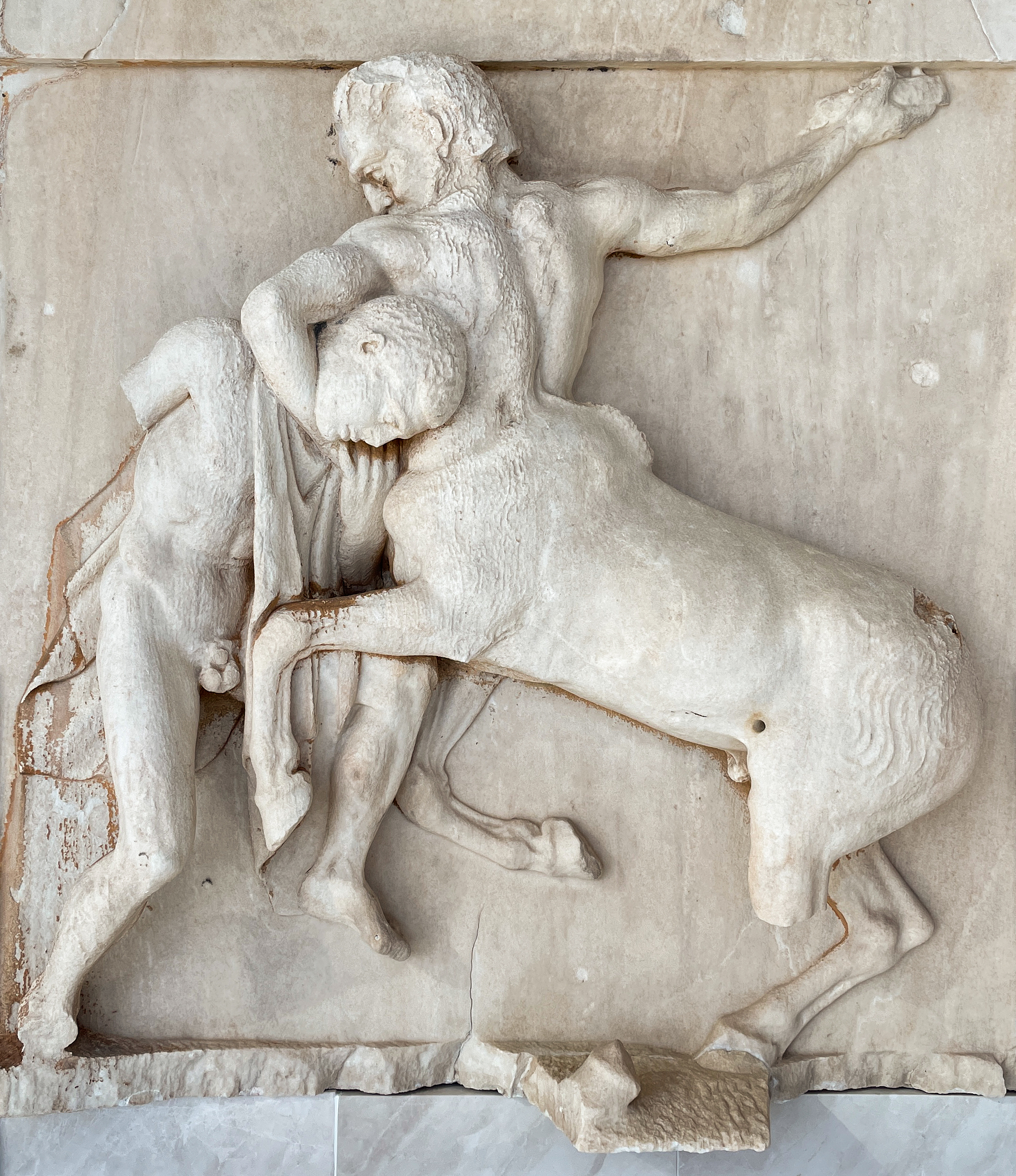
South I, (in the Acropolis museum).

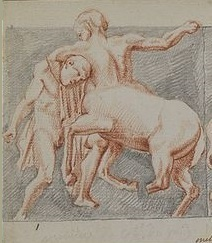
South I drawn in 1674.

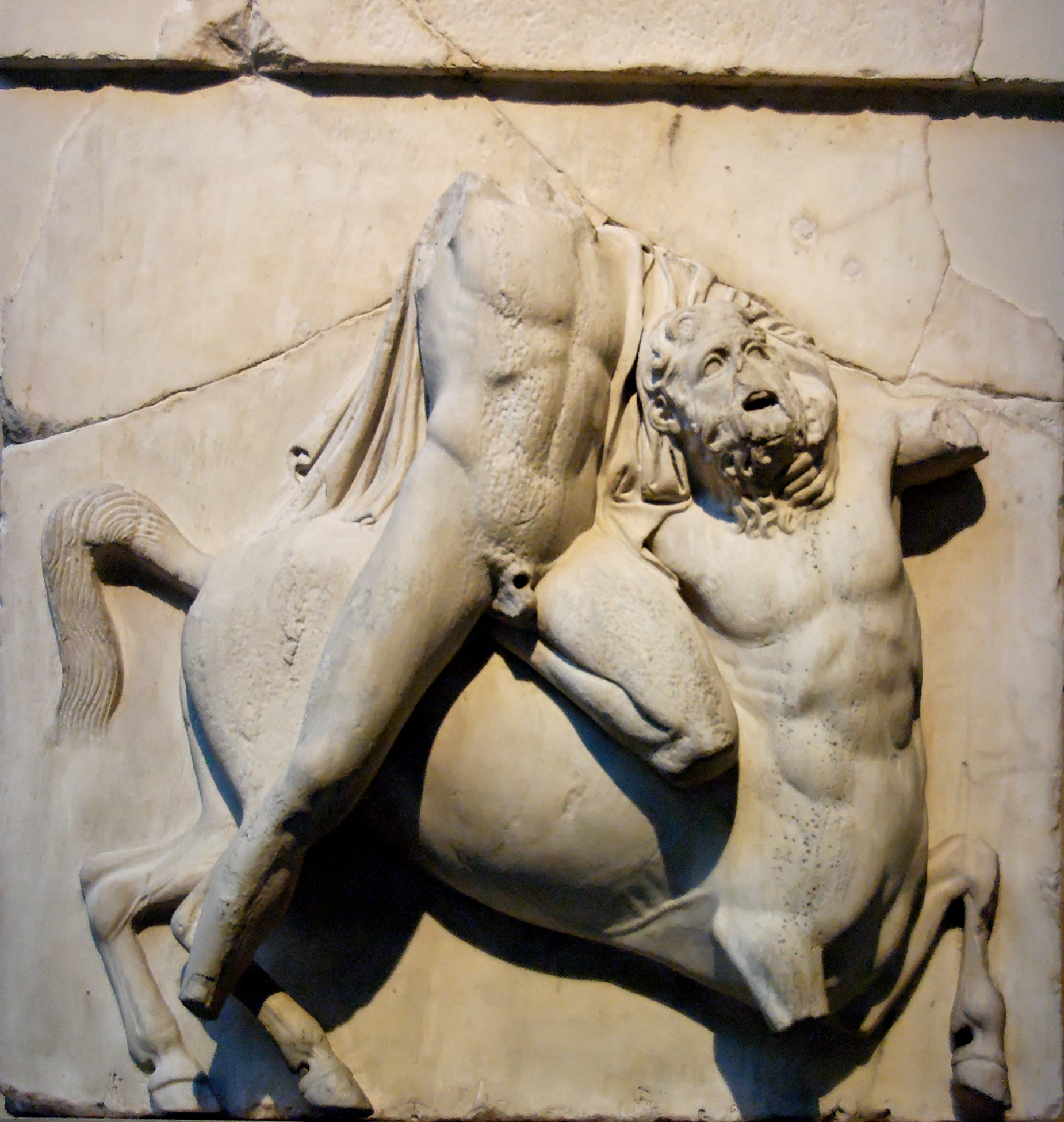
South II.

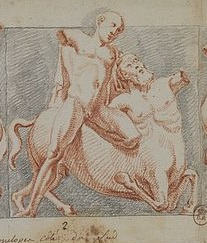
South II drawn in 1674.

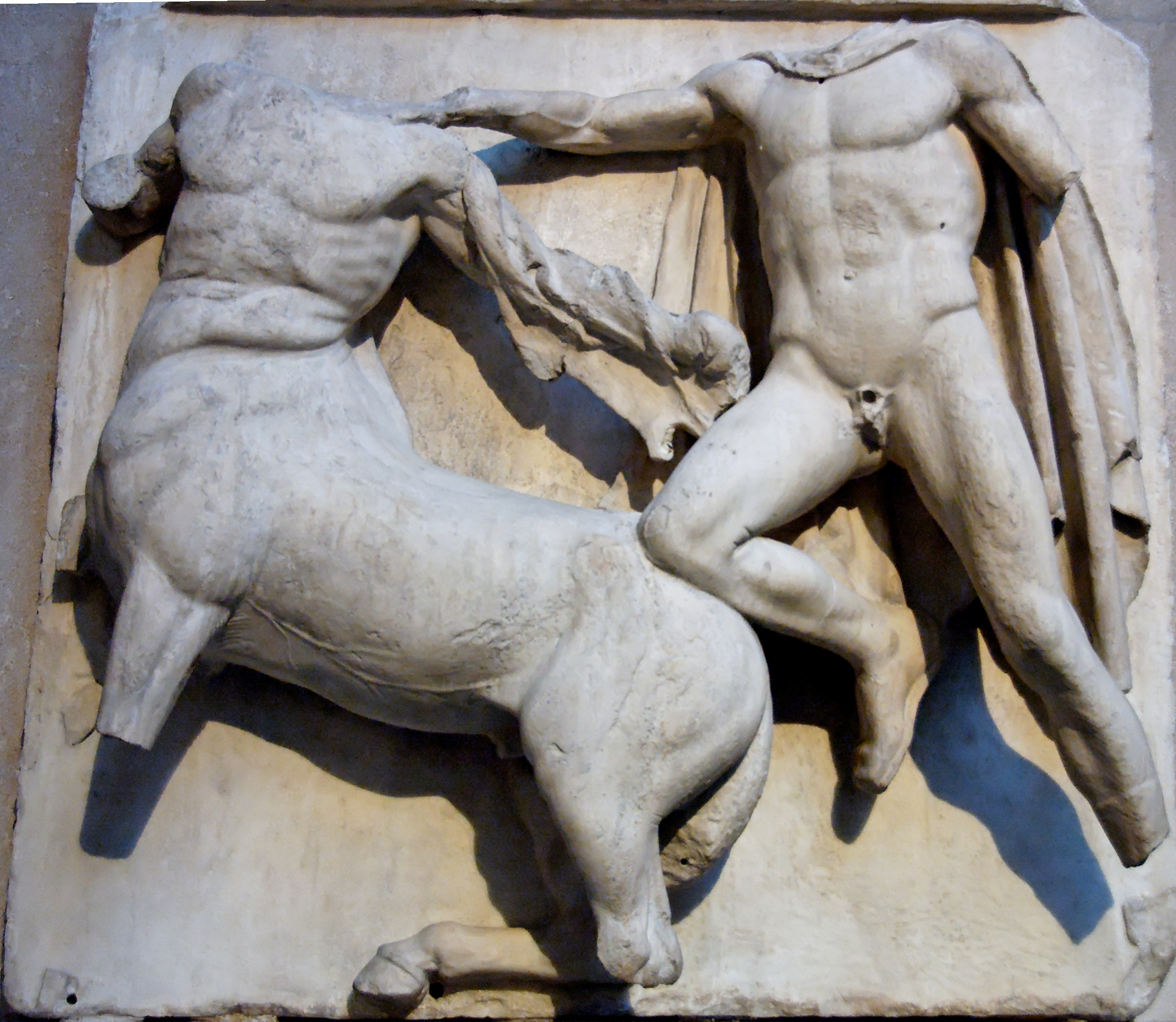
South III.

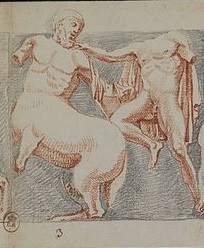
South III drawn in 1674.

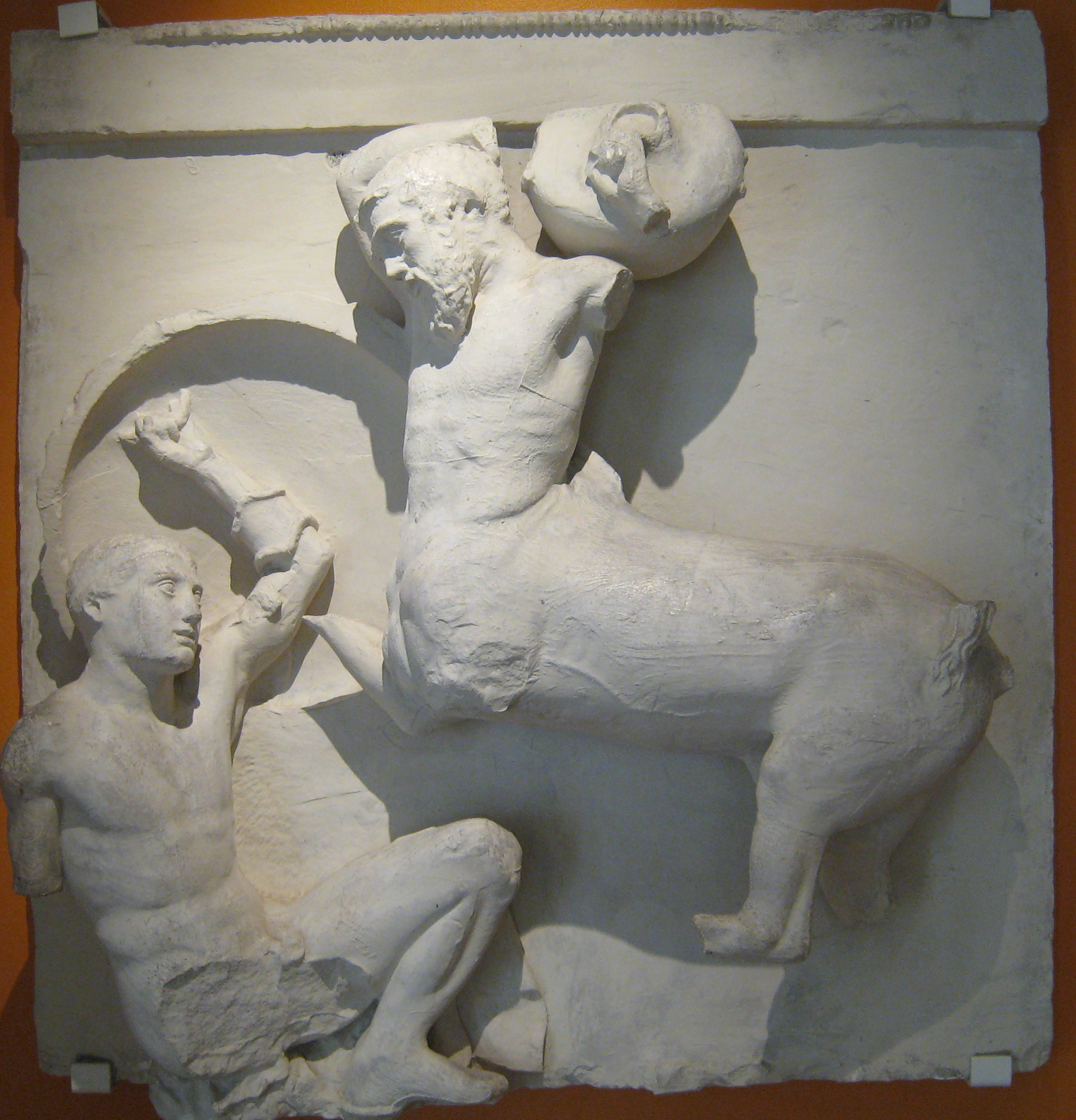
South IV, with the heads restored.

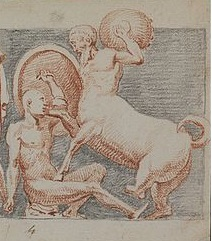
South IV drawn in 1674.

The metope south I was one of the last to be still in place on the Parthenon, in the southwest corner, it was removed in 2013 and it is now in the Acropolis museum, it was replaced by a copy on site. A rearing Centaur, on the right, strangles with his left arm a Lapith in a mantle, on the left. He is about to deliver a fatal blow to his human adversary with an object held in his right hand, perhaps a tree trunk that would have been painted on the bottom of the metope. The right arm of Lapith has disappeared. However, a hole in Centaur's groin could give indications. The Lapithe would be piercing his opponent with a long metal object: lance or spit roasting. If it is a spear and we accept the hypothesis of the tree trunk, then this metope would be proof that the fight has moved outside. The next metope (south II) has a reverse setting. A Centaur, in the background, has the knees of the front legs on the ground while a Lapith, in the foreground, strangles her left arm while pushing her left knee in the back. On the southern metope III, a Lapith in a mantle, on the right, attacks a Centaur from behind. He jumps on his back and takes it to his throat. The belts and sheath of Lapithe were to be in bronze: the fixing holes are still visible.

On the southern metope IV, a Centaur, on the right, is about to trample on a Lapith fallen to the ground on the left. This one protects itself from a shield (the only armour element of the set of South metopes preserved). The Centaur takes the opportunity to try to knock him out with a hydria. This one is used to determine the chronology of the events told by the metopes south: one would still be in the room of the banquet. The South IV Metope is at the British Museum. The heads were removed in 1688 by a Dane in the service of Francesco Morosini and the Venetian army. They are kept at the National Museum of Denmark in Copenhagen. The drawing of 1674 attributed to Jacques Carrey shows that the members still existed then: the general composition is thus better known.

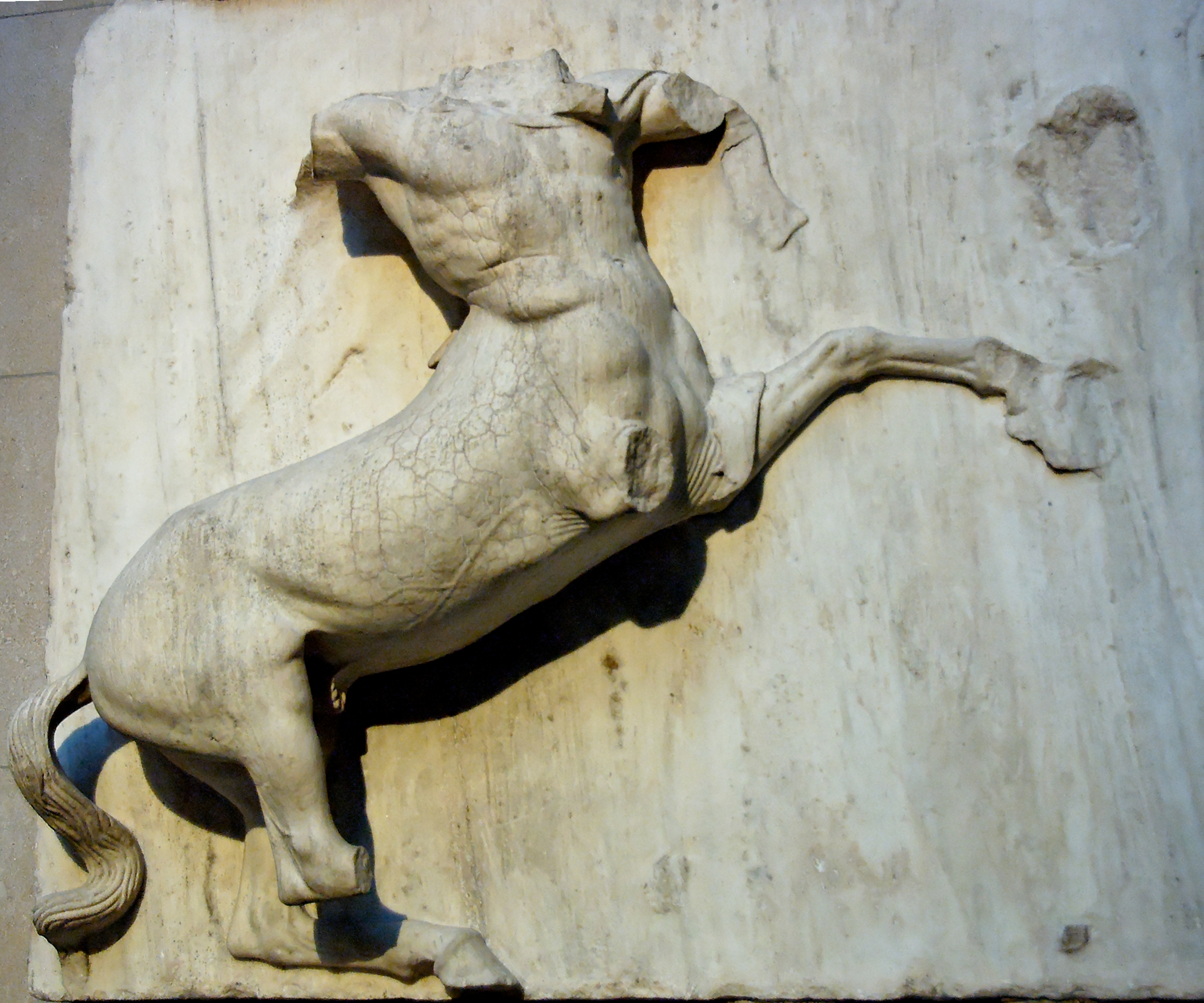
South V.

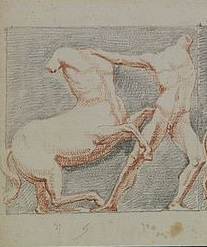
South V drawn in 1674.

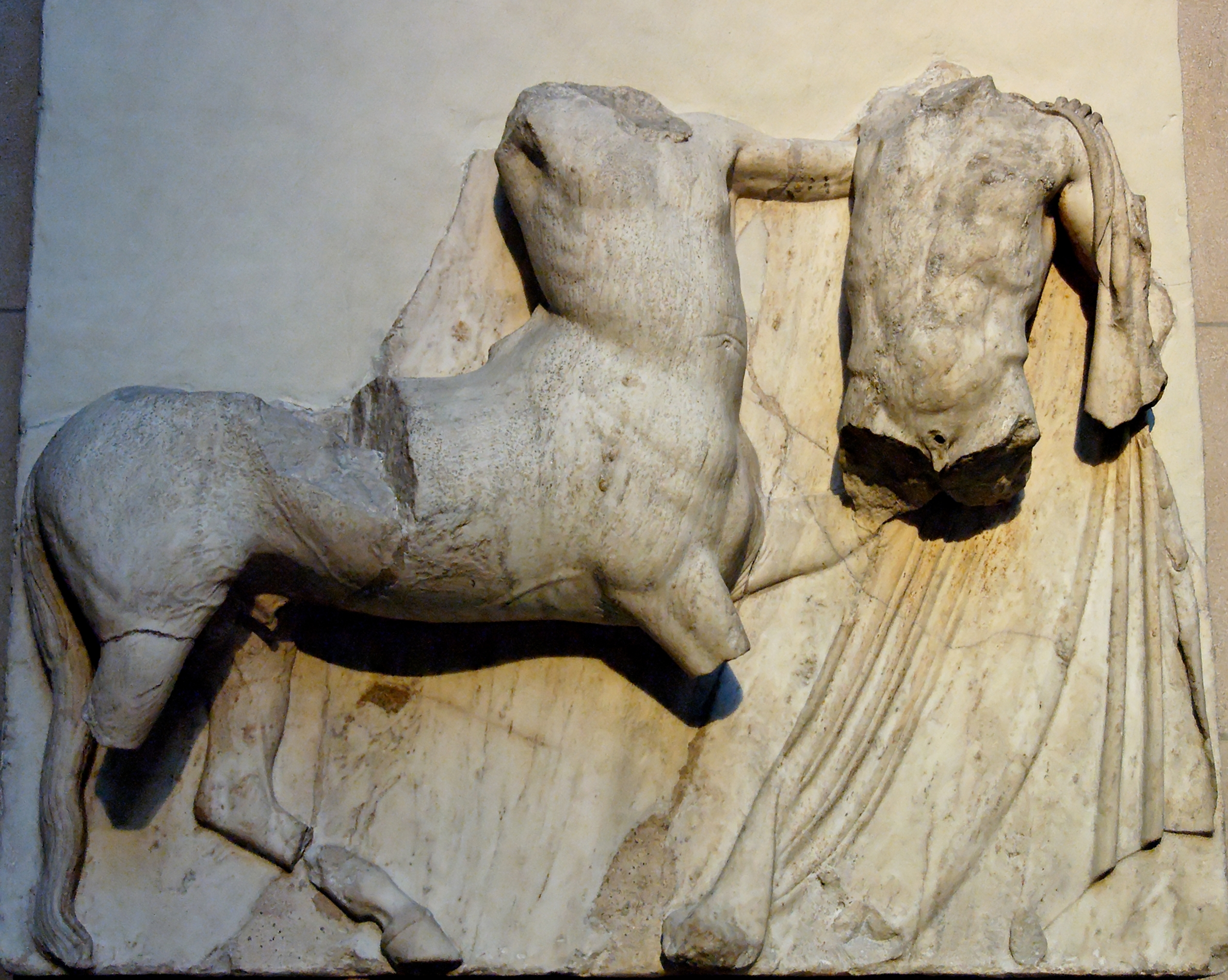
Métope sud VI.

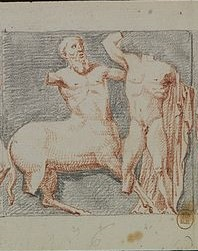
South VI drawn in 1674.

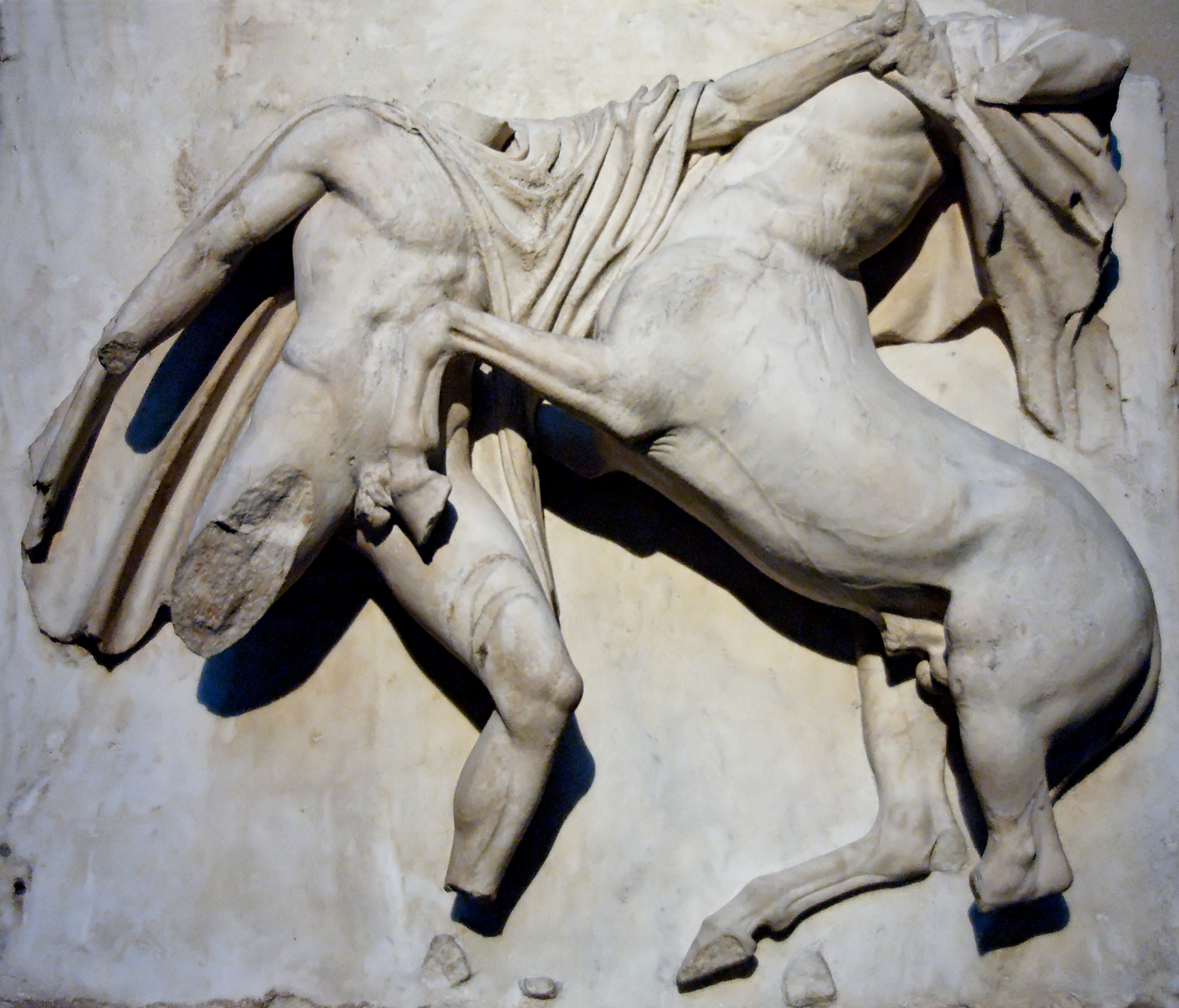
South VII.

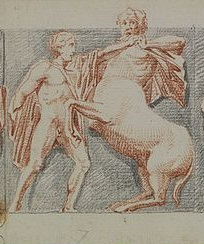
South VII drawn in 1674.

On the southern metope V remains only the Centaur, on the left, but the Lapith is known thanks to the drawing attributed to Carrey (the heads had already disappeared by then). The centaur is pitched up and has grabbed the Lapith by the upper body: he pulls his opponent violently backwards, trying to flee.

On the southern metope VI, an old man (apparent wrinkles, flaccid skin and drooping tail) Centaur, on the right is opposed to a young Lapith wearing a cloak. On the drawing attributed to Carrey, the Lapith gives a blow with the right fist to the Centaur. The composition is unimaginative. It seems that the sculptor has insisted more on the difference of age than on the action. The head of the Centaur, present on the drawing attributed to Carrey, has since disappeared. On the other hand, the head of Lapitha, in place in 1674, was found in 1913 near the Varvakeio therefore at the foot of the Acropolis. She is now at the Acropolis Museum of Athens, while the Metope is at the British Museum.

On the metope south VII, with the left hand, a Lapith, sometimes identified with Pirithoos, on the left, diagonally assault, a punch in the face of a Centaur who rears himself under the effect of the blow and is pushed on the right edge of the metope; his head even protruded from the upper edge. In the right hand, the Lapith had to hold a sword (metal object disappeared since). The Centaur does not wear a skin like the others, but a kind of fluid tissue that flies behind his back. The metope is at the British Museum. The heads are kept separately: that of Lapith is in the Louvre; that of the Centaur at the Acropolis Museum.

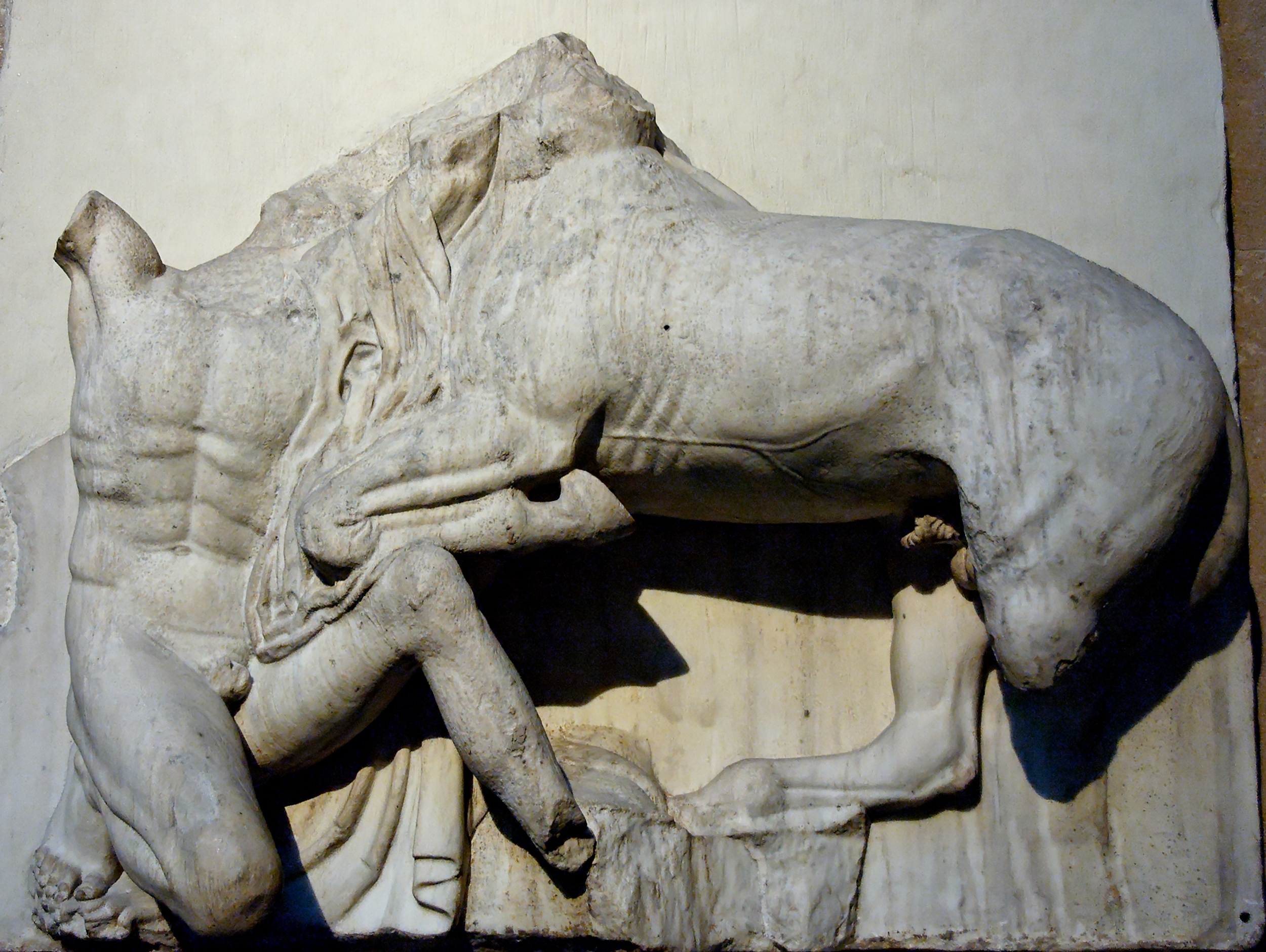
South VIII.

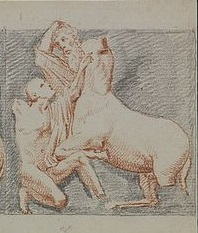
South VIII drawn in 1674.

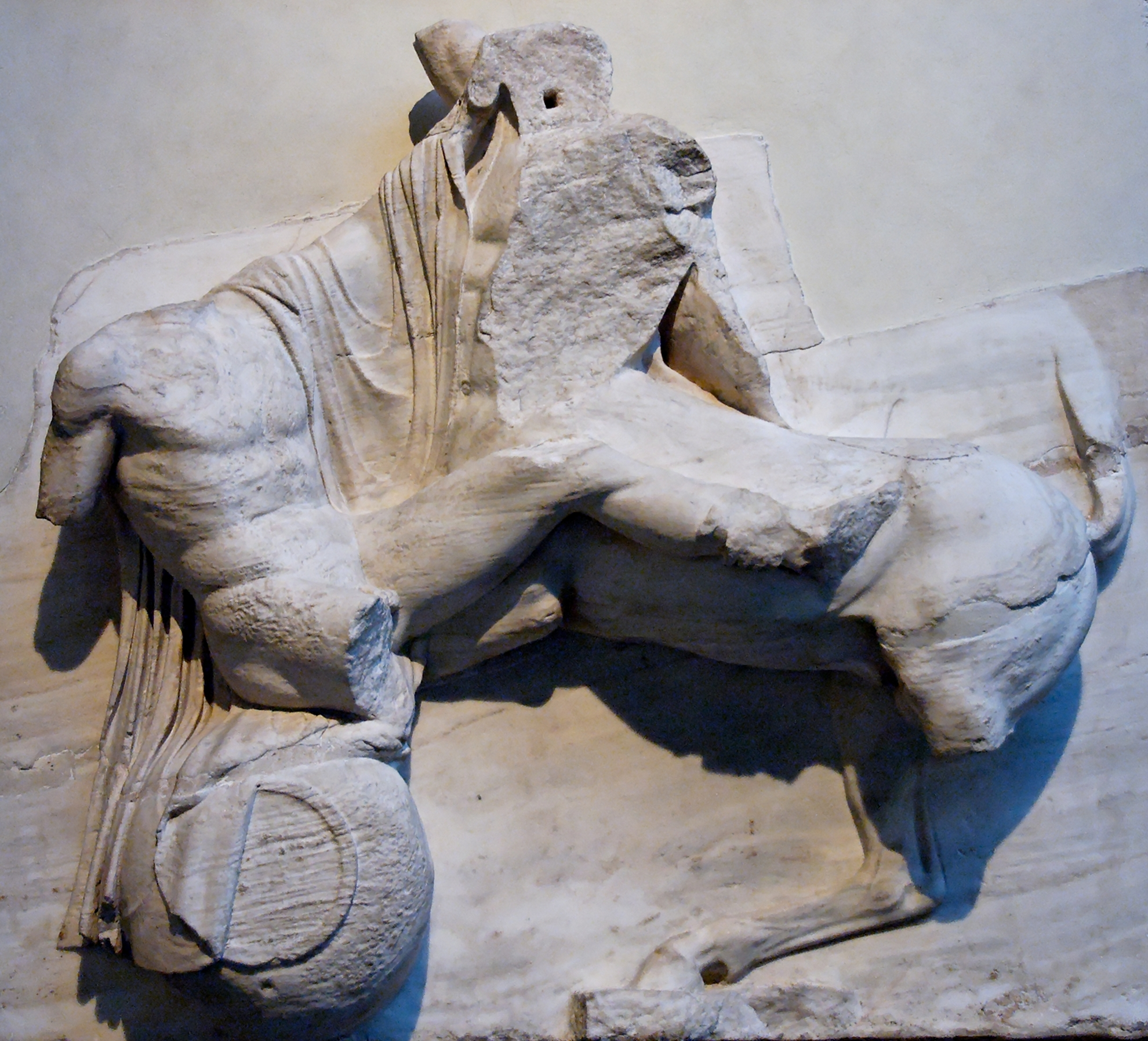
South IX

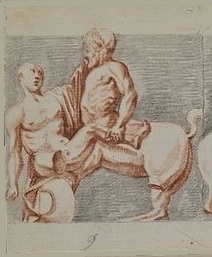
South IX drawn in 1674.

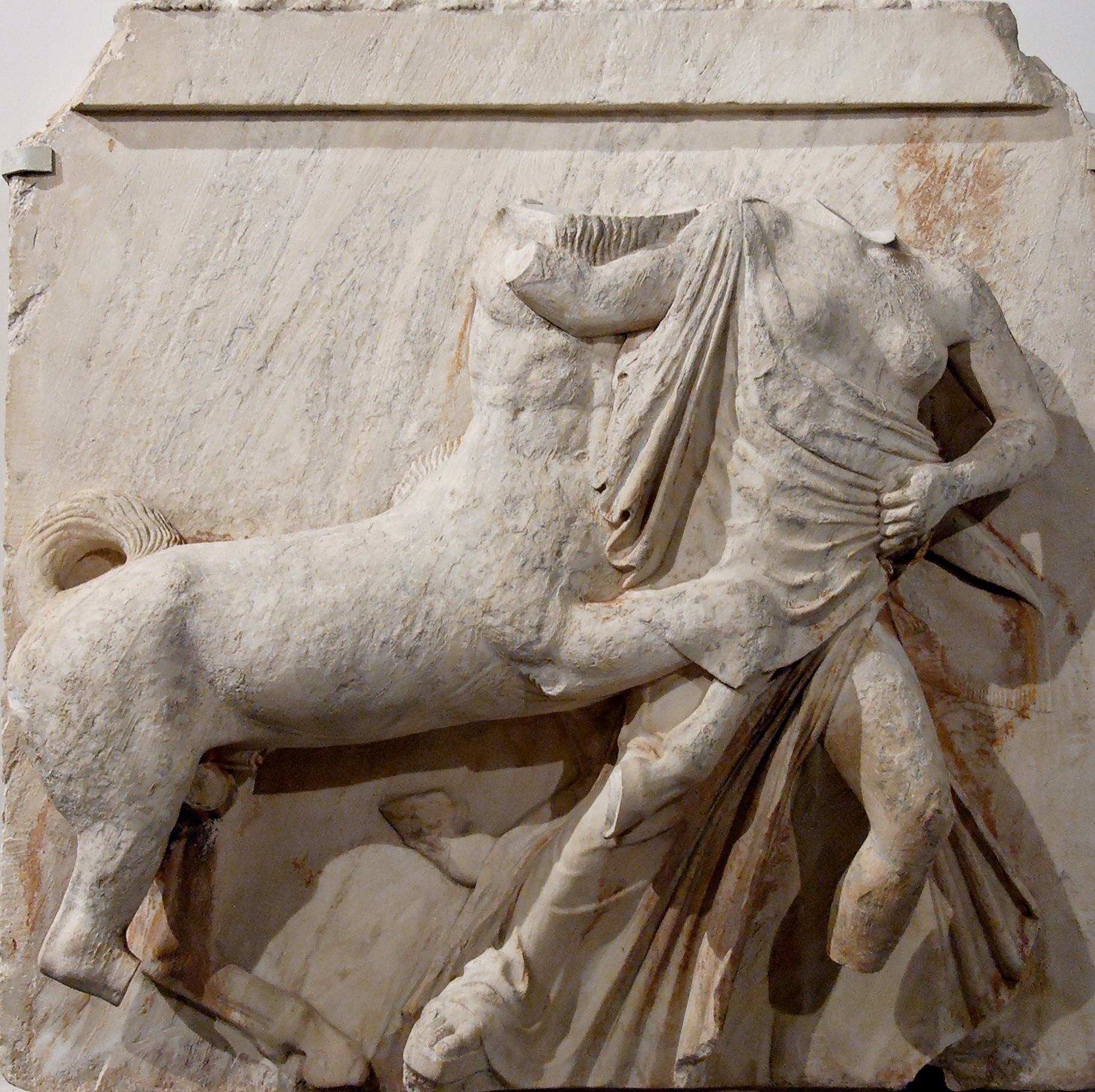
South X.

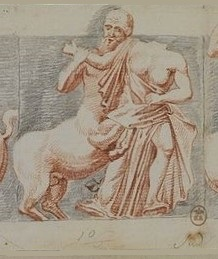
South X drawn in 1674.

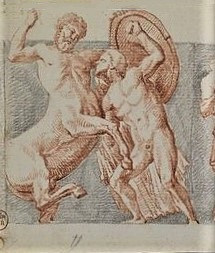
South XI drawn in 1674.

The metope south VIII was badly damaged during the Parthenon explosion in 1687. On the left, a curled Lapith seeks to protect himself from the attack of the Centaur; he might even beg for mercy. The right arm of Lapith has completely disappeared and his gesture is unknown. He remains the Lapith's cloak, descending from his left shoulder to his thigh and the bottom of the beast's skin (perhaps of panther) which the Centaur wore on his right arm. The drawing attributed to Carrey shows that the Centaur had both arms raised; he might be wielding a tree trunk. The abdominal muscles of Lapith are very well marked, but the style remains very fixed, not unlike the severe style of the early fifth century BC. As a result, the sculptor who made this metope might have been older or more conservative, or both, than his colleagues.

The southern metope IX is preserved in the British Museum, but the heads of Lapith and Centaurs, which Carrey's drawing still shows, are preserved in the Acropolis Museum, as well as fragments of the shoulder and arms. The Centaur, on the right, with his left hand caught Lapithe's thigh, which he thus unbalanced. He's about to knock him out with something he's holding over his head. The Lapithe falls on a hydria or a dinos. He tries to recover by grabbing his opponent's hair with his left hand and placing the right (as Carrey's drawing shows) on the ground.

The metope South X, considered as little successful, represents the cause of the fight: a woman carried away by a Centaur. This one is bald if one believes the drawing attributed to Carrey. He squeezes Lapithe between the thighs of his front legs; the right leg lifting the woman's peplos. He also uses the left arm to grip it. In his right hand, he also holds the Lapith's right wrist (this movement is gone). She tries to flee, without success. In her desperate gesture, she discovers her left thigh and shoulder as well as her chest. The woman is sometimes identified with Hippodamia or her "maid of honor". From the South XI metope remain only fragments and the drawing attributed to Carrey. On the latter, a Centaur to the left is pitched up and getting ready to hit a Lapith. This one, naked, wears only a cloak. In the right arm, he has a big round shield. He is sometimes identified with Theseus.

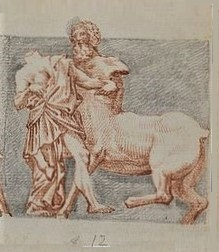
South XII drawn in 1674.

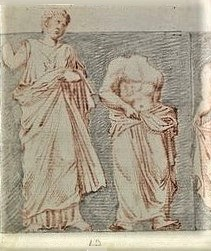
South XIII drawn in 1674.

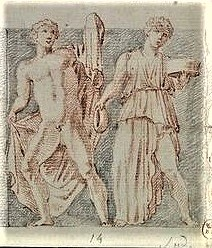
South XIV drawn in 1674.

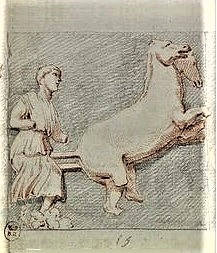
South XV drawn in 1674.

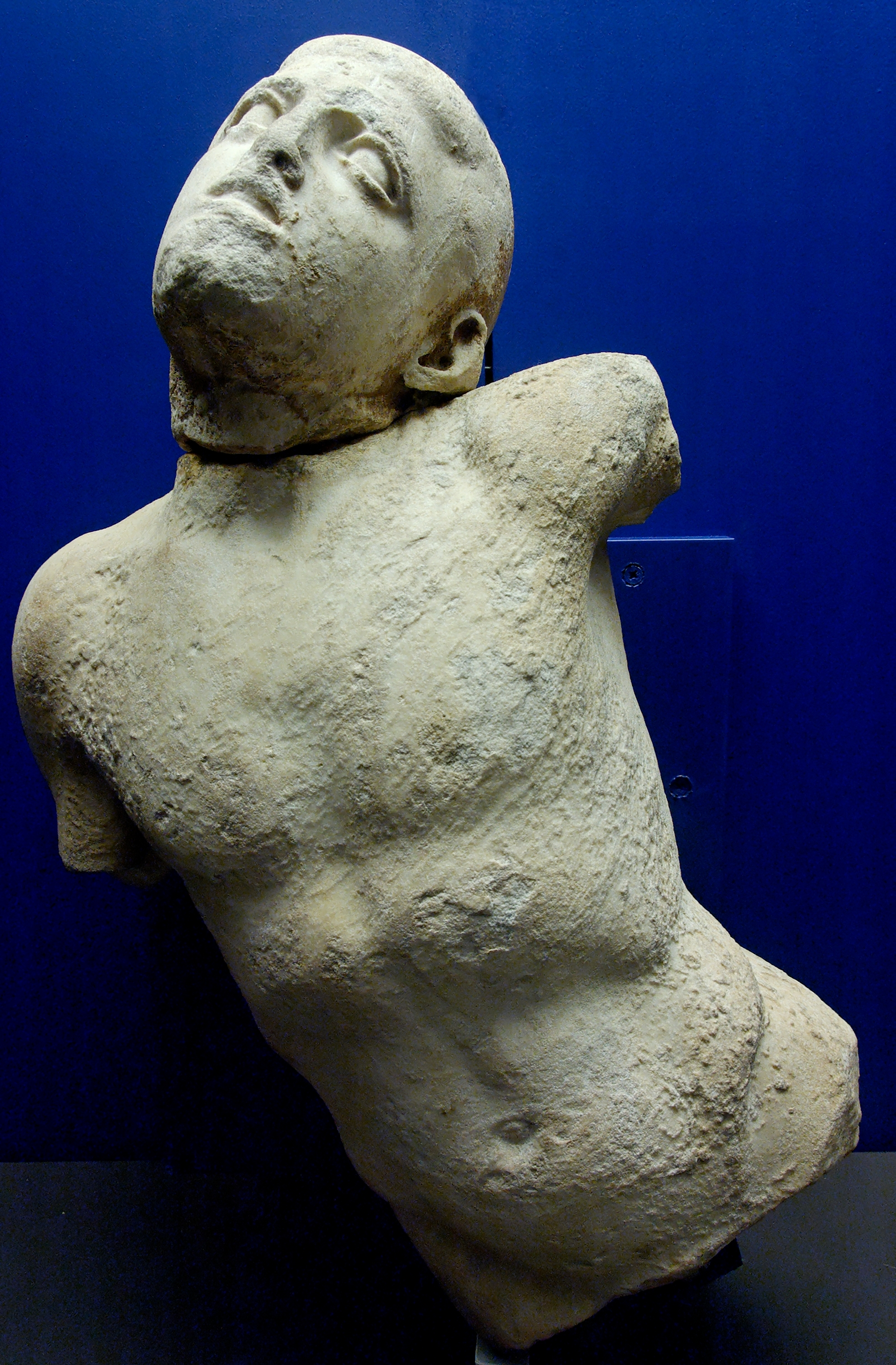
South XVI.

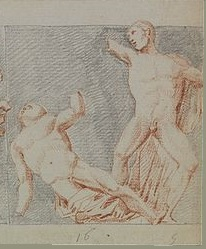
South XVI drawn in 1674.

The southern metope XII is also one of five where a Centaur attacks a Lapith. The woman, on the left, tries to free herself from the grip of the Centaur, but her feet already touch the ground only toes. She is sometimes identified with Hippodamia, kidnapped by Eurytion. Indeed, the composition of the metope is inversely symmetrical with respect to the South X metope. The three southern metopes X, XI and XII are then sometimes read together: Centaur and Bridesmaid; Centaur and Theseus; Hippodamia and Eurytion.

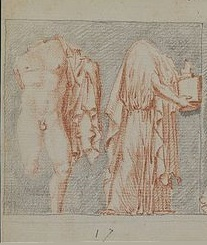
South XVII drawn in 1674.

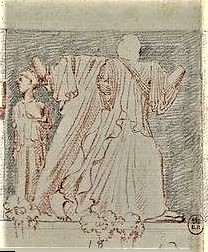
South XVIII drawn in 1674.

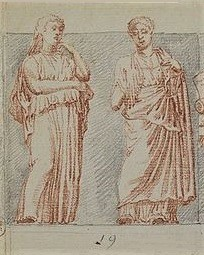
South XIX drawn in 1674.

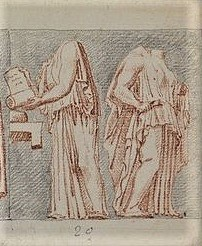
South XX drawn in 1674.

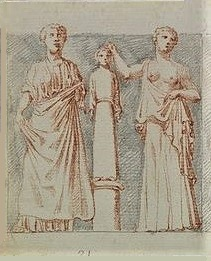
South XXI drawn in 1674.

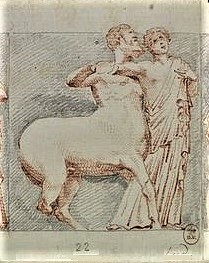
South XXII drawn in 1674.

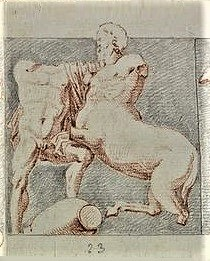
South XXIII drawn in 1674.

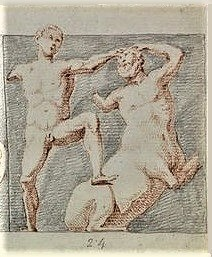
South XXIV drawn in 1674.

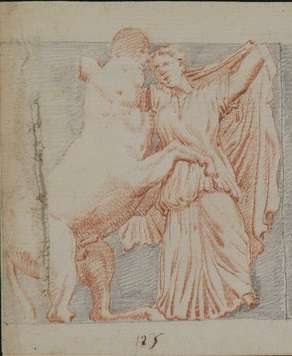
South XXV drawn in 1674.

The following metopes, from south XIII to south XXV, are known only from the drawings attributed to Carrey. Some fragments have been found allowing reconstitution. On March 24, 2023, a head of a bearded man from south XVI was repatriated from the Vatican Museums. As these metopes do not represent only Lapithe-Centaur duels, only present on south XXII to south XXV, various other interpretations have been proposed for metopes south XIII to XXI, sometimes without any connection with the episode of the marriage of Hippodamia and Pirithoos. Erich Pernice and Frantz Studniczka read the myth of Erichthonios and the erection of the cult statue of Athena Polias. Charles Picard shares the opinion that this is the same myth of Erichthonios but he rather suggests the creation of Panathenae. Erika Simon sees the story of another Lapith, Ixion, the father of Pirithoos. Martin Robertson prefers the myth of Daedalus, with traveling geographical locations (South XIII to XVI in Athens, South XVII and XVIII in Knossos, return to Athens for South XIX to XXI). Burkhard Fehr wants to read the opposition between the "good" wife Alceste (wife of Admetus) and the "bad" wife Phaedrus (wife of Theseus). According to Hilda Westervelt (Note: The work 'The Centauromachy in Greek Architectural Sculpture' is expected to be published by Cambridge immenantly.) in her thesis defended at Harvard in 2004, this might not be a punctual event, but an account of the entire marriage of Hippodamia and Pirithoos. In the center is represented the moment when at the wedding the bride leaves the paternal house for that of her husband; the procession would then be disturbed by centaurs already drunk; the fight then extends to the outer metopes.

Suggestion of identification The figures are read left to right.
Metope	South XIII Female figure (left) Male figure nude torso (right)	South XIV Male figure nude (left) Female figure carrying an object in each hand (right)	South XV A charioteer and his chariot	South XVI Two male nude figures The one on the left is on the ground	South XVII Male nude figure (left) Female figure carrying an object (right)	South XVIII Small human figure (left) Two female figures (courant ?) (center and right)	South XIX Two female figures	South XX Two female figures The one on the left seems to hold a roll of text	South XXI Two female figures framing a small statue on a pedestal
According to Brøndsted & 1826-1830 revised by Michaelis 1871	Demeter and Triptolemus	Epimetheus and Pandora	Erichthonios	Eumolpos or Immaradus and Erechtheus	Erichthonios and a priestess of Athena or a kanephoros	One of the daughters of Cecrops I	Pandrosus and Telete or Themis	Priestess or young woman carrying texts of laws	Parturient, cult statue of Artemis and priestess
According to Pernice 1895	Pandrosus and Herse	Erysichthon and Aglaurus	Erichthonius of Athens	Amphictyon and Erichthonius	Erichthonius	?	Priestess	Woman carrying ribbons to adorn the xoanon of Athena Polias	Two women framing the xoanon of Athena Polias
According to Studniczka 1912	Pythia and Ion	Xouthos and Creusa	Charioteer of the chariot of the right-hand figure on metope south XVI	Eumolpos or Immaradus and Erechtheus	Herald and Citharede	Daughter of Praxithea	Praxithea and one of her daughters chosen for sacrifice	Two women offering a sacrifice	Two women fleeing centaurs and taking refuge with the xoanon
According to Picard 1936	A daughter of Cecrops	Aglaure and one of his brothers	Discovery of the basket of Erichthonios	Asterion and Erichthonios	Erichthonios and a lyre player	Preparations for mysteries	Priestess and her assistant	Demonstration of a text roll and priestess	Back to the centauromachy; xoanon of Artemis
According to Becatti 1951	Pandrosus and Cecrops	Erysichthon et Aglaurus	Charioteer of Erechtheus's chariot	Immaradus and Erechtheus	Erechtheus with a piglet offering and Apollo	A daughter of Erechtheus	Praxithea and one of her daughters chosen for sacrifice	Procne and Philomela	Return to the centauromachy; Sophrosyne and Hybris
According to Fehl 1961	Centauromachy; fright created by the arrival of a hero's chariot	Centauromachy; fright created by the arrival of a hero's chariot	Charioteer of the chariot of Heracles or of Theseus	Lapithe wounded by a Centaur and arrival of Hercules or Theseus	Centauromachy; two girls	Centauromachy	Centauromachy	Centauromachy; wedding ceremony of Hippodamia and Pirithous	Two girls fleeing centaurs and taking refuge at a cult statue
According to Jeppesen 1963	Aphrodite and Butes (Note: Kristian Jeppesen evokes Butes son of Boreas, the father of Hippodamia (taking Diodorus of Sicily, IV, 70), but he insists on the homonymy with the Attic hero Butes son of Pandion, brother of Erechtheus even with Butes son of Teleon lover of Aphrodite and father of Eryx, present on the South XVI metope. (Jeppesen 1963, p. 36).)	Apollo and Creusa	Erichthonios and a racehorse	Eryx defeated in boxing by Heracles	Erechtheus and Apollo	Chthonia and her sisters	Demeter and Persephone	Procne and Philomela	Two Lapiths fleeing centaurs and taking refuge at a cult statue
According to Brommer 1967	Pythia and Ion	Xouthos and Creusa	Metope linked to Erechtheus	Eumolpos or Immaradus and Erechtheus	Player of an aulos or carrier of wine and singer	Daughter of Erechtheus	Praxithea and one of her daughters chosen for sacrifice	Refusal of all the interpretations given so far, but no proposal for interpretation either for the metope or for the object carried by the woman on the left	Two women fleeing centaurs and taking refuge at a cult statue
According to Simon 1975	Nurse of Hippodamia and sommelier	Butes (Note: Probably Butes son of Boreas, father of Hippodamie) and a young woman carrying offerings	Helios	Sacrilege of Ixion	Hermes with a piglet offering for the atonement of Ixion and Apollo by a Citharede	Little statue of divinity; Aidos and Nemesis fleeing the atrocity of Ixion	Nephele and Peitho or Aphrodite	Apate or Atë and Hera	Two women fleeing centaurs and taking refuge at a cult statue of Hera
According to Dörig 1978	Herse and Cecrops	Erysichthon and Aglaurus	Boreas removing Orithyia	Erechtheus and Eumolpos	Procession to the cult statue present on the metope South XVIII during the Panathenaea	Statue of worship and two friends of Orithyia fleeing before Boreas after he removed it	Procne and Philomela	Zeuxippe and Chthonia	Two young Lapiths fleeing centaurs and taking refuge at a cult statue
According to Harrison 1979	Coronis, one of the nurses of Dionysos and Dionysos	Coronis rapt by Butes	Helios	Sacrilege of Ixion	Pirithoos wedding: actor wearing a beast skin and lyre player	Pirithoos wedding: little girl and two dancers	Marriage of Pirithoos: mother and sister of the bride (Hippodamia)	Pirithoos' wedding: sister and mother of the fiancé (Pirithoos)	?
According to Fehr 1982	Phaedra spying Hippolytus	Phaedra trying to seduce Hippolytus	Hippolytus going to his death	Asclepius killed by Zeus	Hermes carrying a bottle of wine and Apollo singing	The Moires	Alcestis and a nurse	Preparation of the Alceste funeral bed: a nurse and Alcestis	Two women fleeing centaurs and taking refuge at a cult statue
According to Robertson 1984	In Athens: Perdix and Talos	In Athens: Daedalus and a young girl wearing the invention of Talos	In Athens: Helios	In Athens: Icarus and Dedalus	In Knossos: Daedalus and Theseus in chorus	In Knossos: Ariadne and two statues created by Daedalus dancing on the music of Theseus	In Athens after the return of Daedalus: discovery of the spinning wheel and weaving	In Athens after the return of Daedalus: discovery of the spinning wheel and weaving	Back to the centauromachy; worship statue of Athena

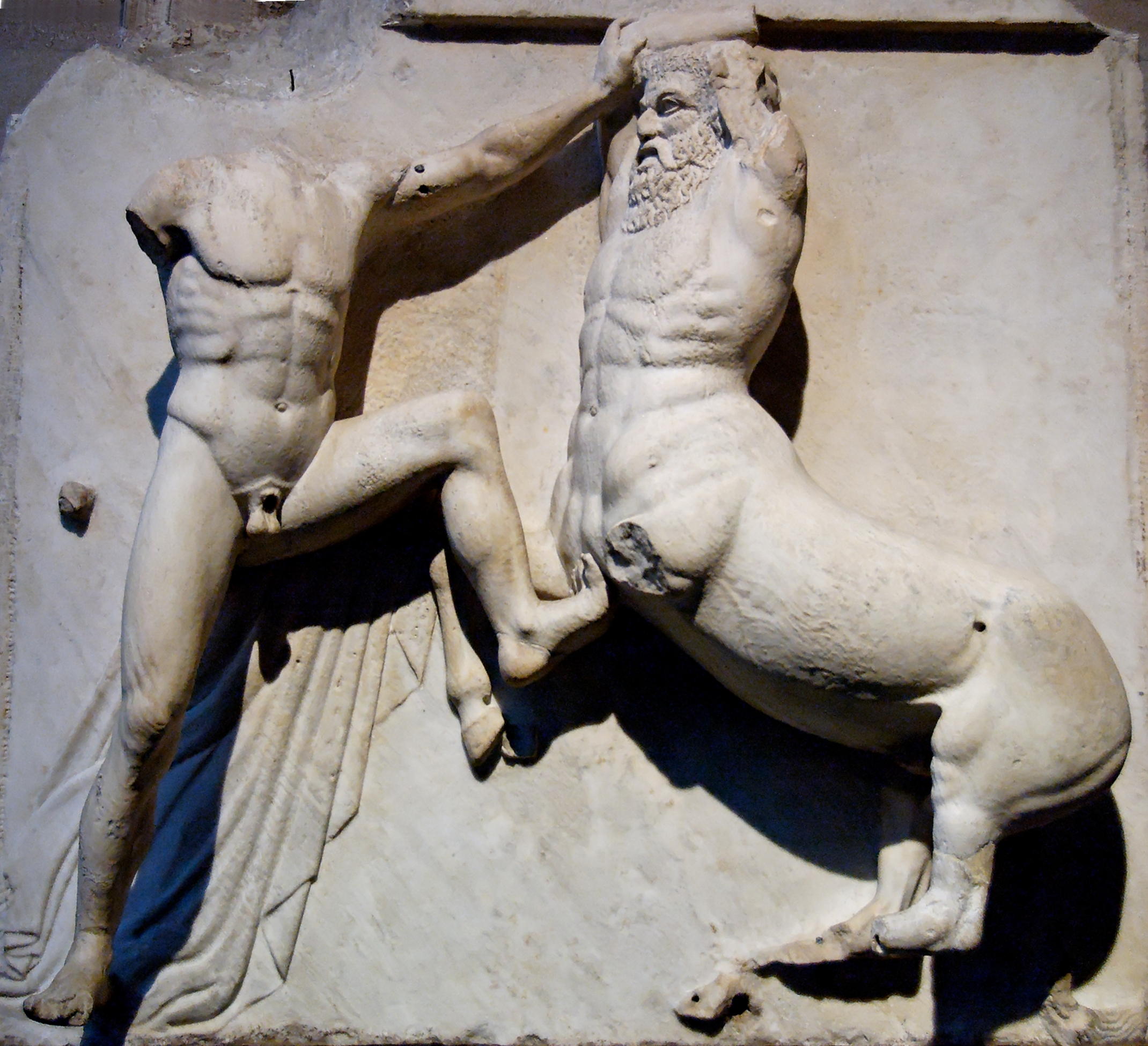
South sud XXVI.

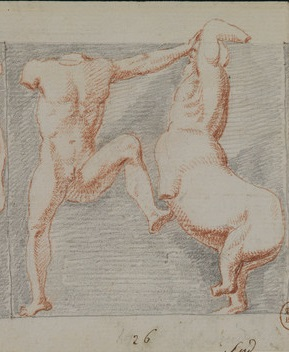
South XXVI drawn in 1674.

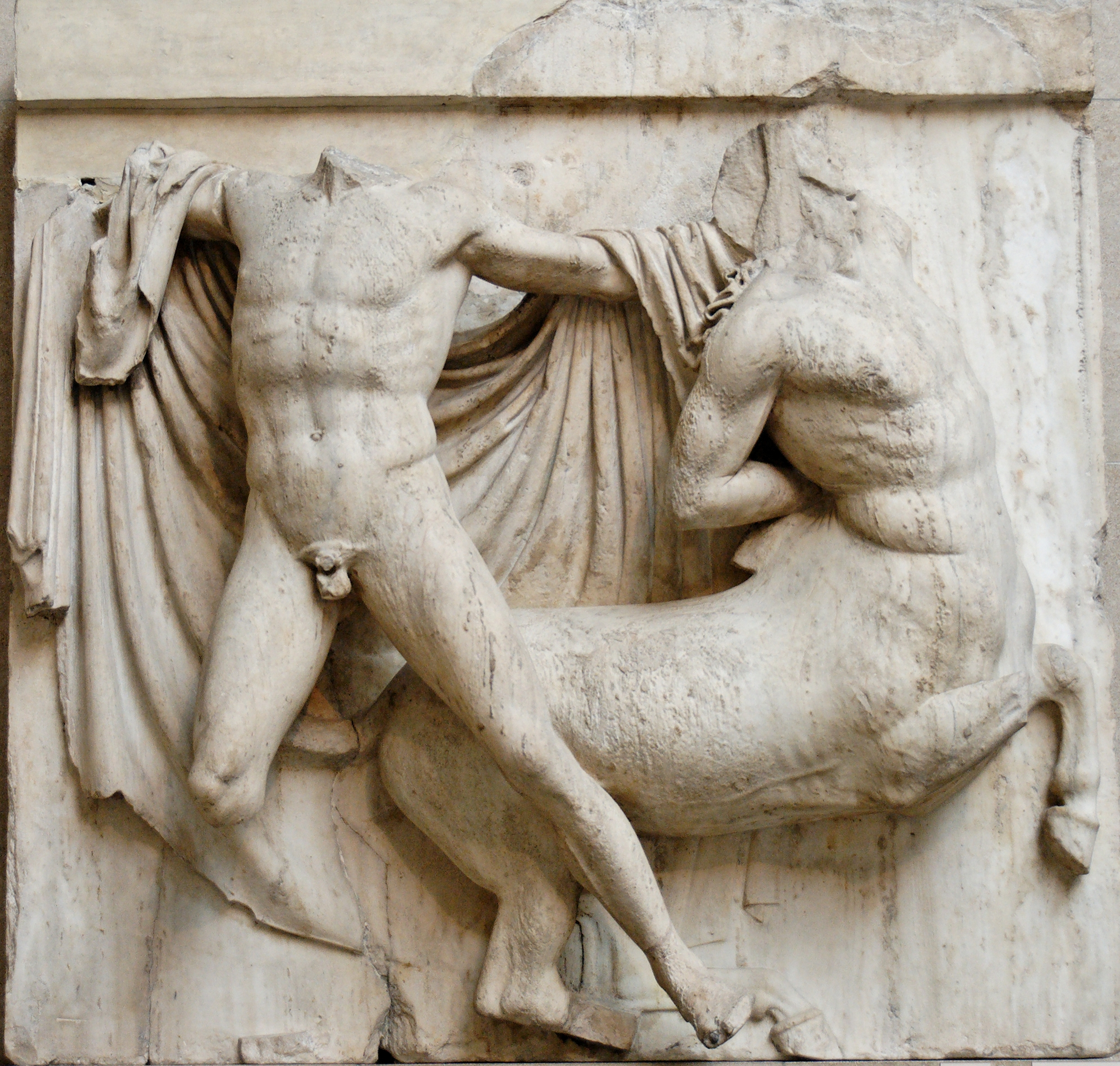
South XXVII.

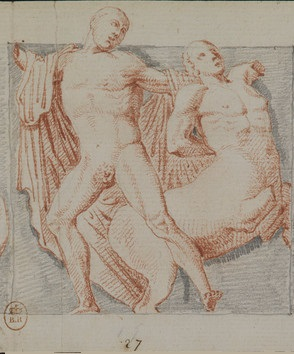
South XXVII drawn in 1674.

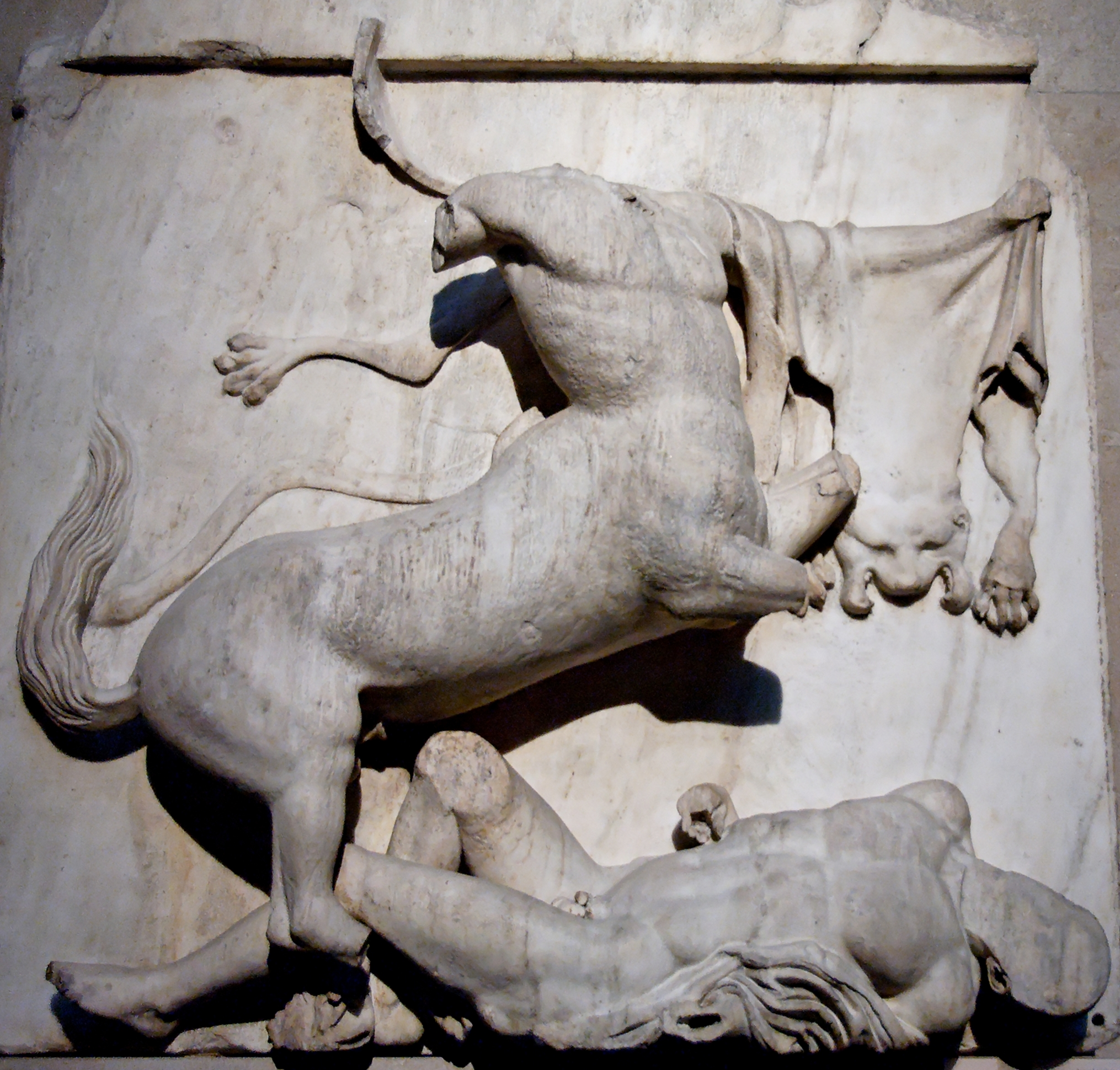
South XXVIII.

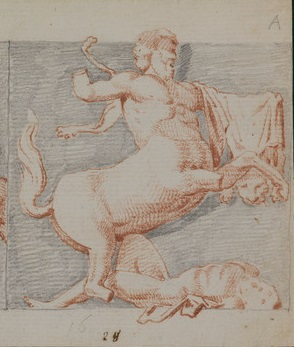
South XXVIII drawn in 1674.

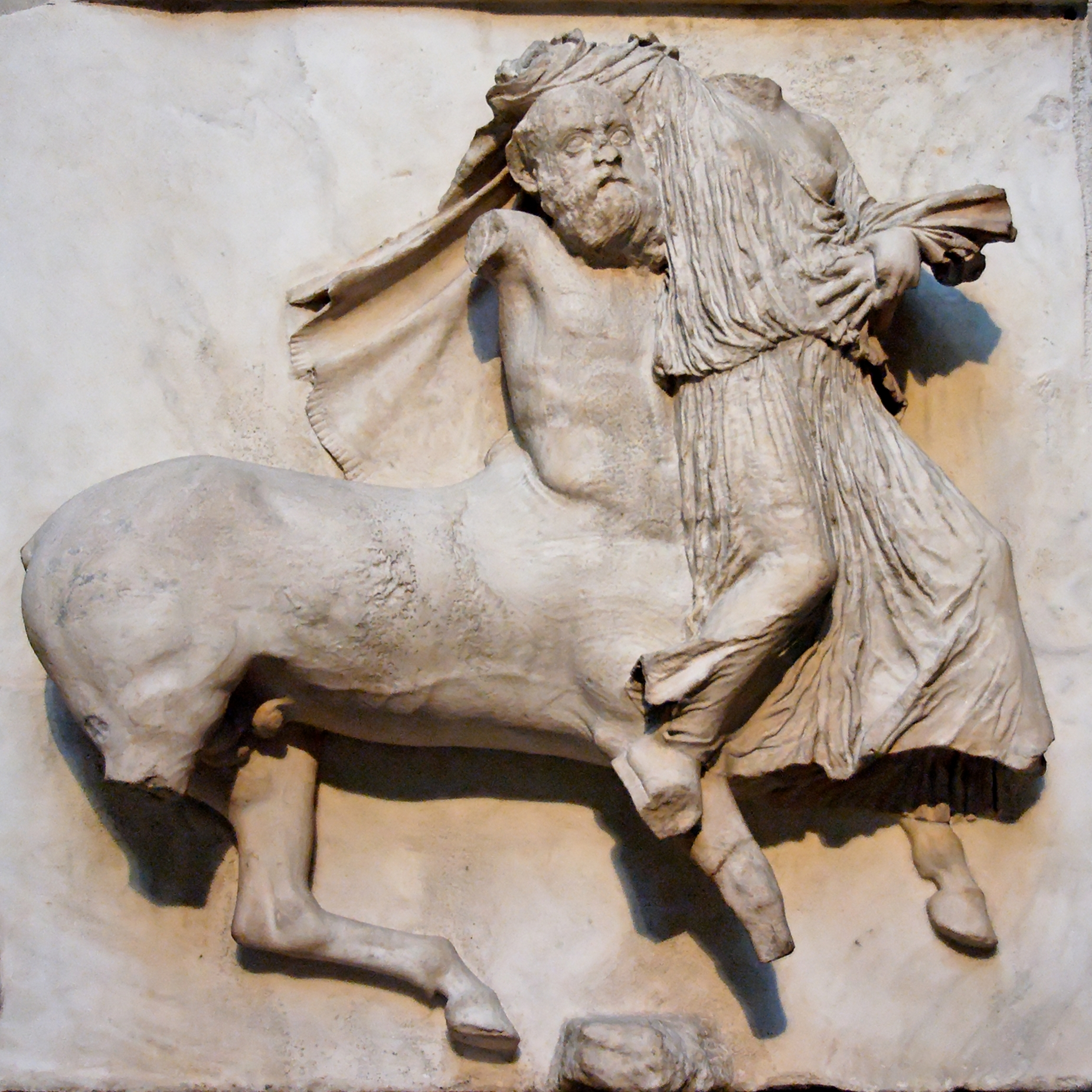
South XXIX.

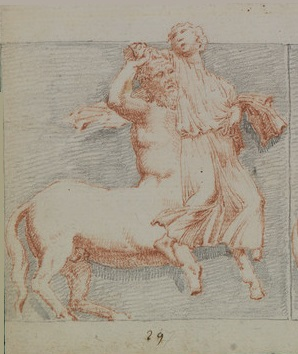
South XXIX drawn in 1674.

The metope south XXVI could have been sculpted by one of the least competent artists. Movements are unlikely; the face of the Centaur is frozen and the style of sculpture (severe) is old-fashioned for this second half of the fifth century BC.; the head of the Centaur is placed directly on the shoulders: he has no neck. Finally, a part of Lapith's garment drape did not hold and fell at a very old date. The Lapith on the left gives a shot of his left foot in the chest of the Centaur; in his left hand he also grabs his right elbow. The Centaur seems to carry over the head a heavy object (block of stone or altar) that he is about to launch on his opponent. It seems that a well was present under the legs of the two characters. This element of scenery could mean (like the hypothetical tree trunk on South I) that the fight has moved outside.

On the metope south XXVII, the Centaur, wounded, tries to flee at a gallop. He put his right hand on the wound he received in the back, unless he used both hands to try to extract the object that hurt him. The Lapithe, who could also be the hero Theseus, tries to prevent him from fleeing, gripping his neck, with his left hand. His right hand is backward, catching up with a new blow, probably fatal with either a spear or a roasting spit. His coat is sliding from his shoulders to the ground. The faces of the two characters were turned towards the centre of the metope. The heads have disappeared since the drawings attributed to Carrey. However, if the metope is in the British Museum, the Lapith's head is kept at the Acropolis Museum in Athens. This head is however also considered as being able to come from metope south IX. "Carrey" drew a beardless Centaur. Several hypotheses are then advanced: the designer would not have seen that the beard had been broken; the ancient sculptor created with this metope a new canon of representation of the Centaurs as much younger. This metope south XXVII is considered one of the most successful. The rendering of the anatomy is perfect. The tension of the movement is visible in the sculpture of the muscles of Lapith's leg and torso. The drape, perfect, of the mantle is in such high relief that it is detached almost completely from the bottom. The tail of the Centaur is part of the continuity of one of the folds of the coat: it had to be painted in different colours to bring out. This movement of the mantle recalls that of figure M of the pediment of the Temple of Zeus at Olympia, traditionally identified with Theseus, hence the identification here. The composition is subtle: the two tensions in two opposite directions recall those characteristic of the central group of a pediment, similar to the movement that animates Athena and Poseidon on the west pediment. Finally, it also recalls the western metope IV of the temple of Zeus in Olympia (Heracles and the bull of Crete). We also find this motif on the neck of a volute krater attributed to the painter of the Woolly Satyrs and preserved in New York. If the sculptor is not known, he must however be one of the most gifted to have worked on the Parthenon.

The southern metope XXVIII is by its style quite similar to its neighbour south XXVII. A Centaur rears over a Lapithe on the ground. On the left arm, he has a skin of animal, perhaps of panther, which he had to use to protect himself. In the right hand he holds a large vase. If the arm and the vase have disappeared, however, there remains a fragment above the Centaur's shoulder. Martin Robertson suggests that the man the Centaur is about to kill could be Daedalus. The metope south XXIX is one of the five preserved that does not represent the fight, but the cause of the fight: a bald Centaur takes a Lapith woman. He encloses her with his left arm. The drawing attributed to Carrey shows that he held his right wrist with his right hand. The quality of the sculpture is very heterogeneous. The face of the Centaur is frozen and inexpressive; Lapith's position is improbable. In contrast, the drapery of the chiton is of very high quality, the level of that of the Iris of the western pediment; it is the same for the border of the Centaur's mantle, the level of what is on the frieze.

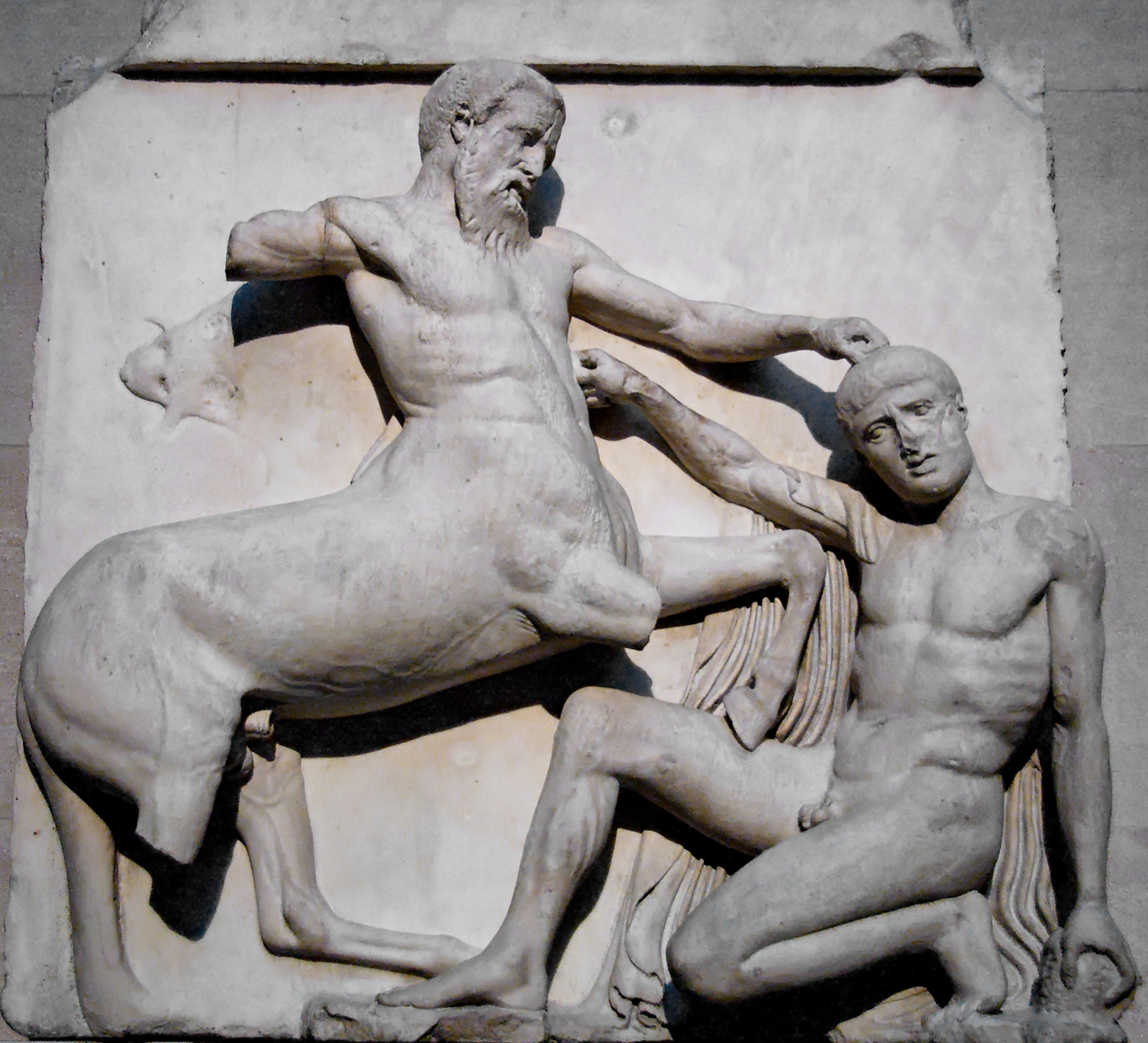
South XXX.

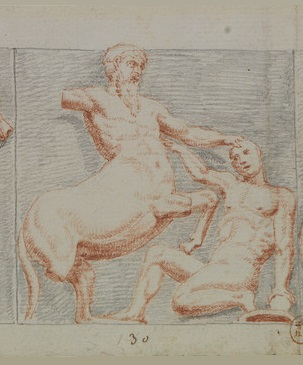
South XXX drawn in 1674.

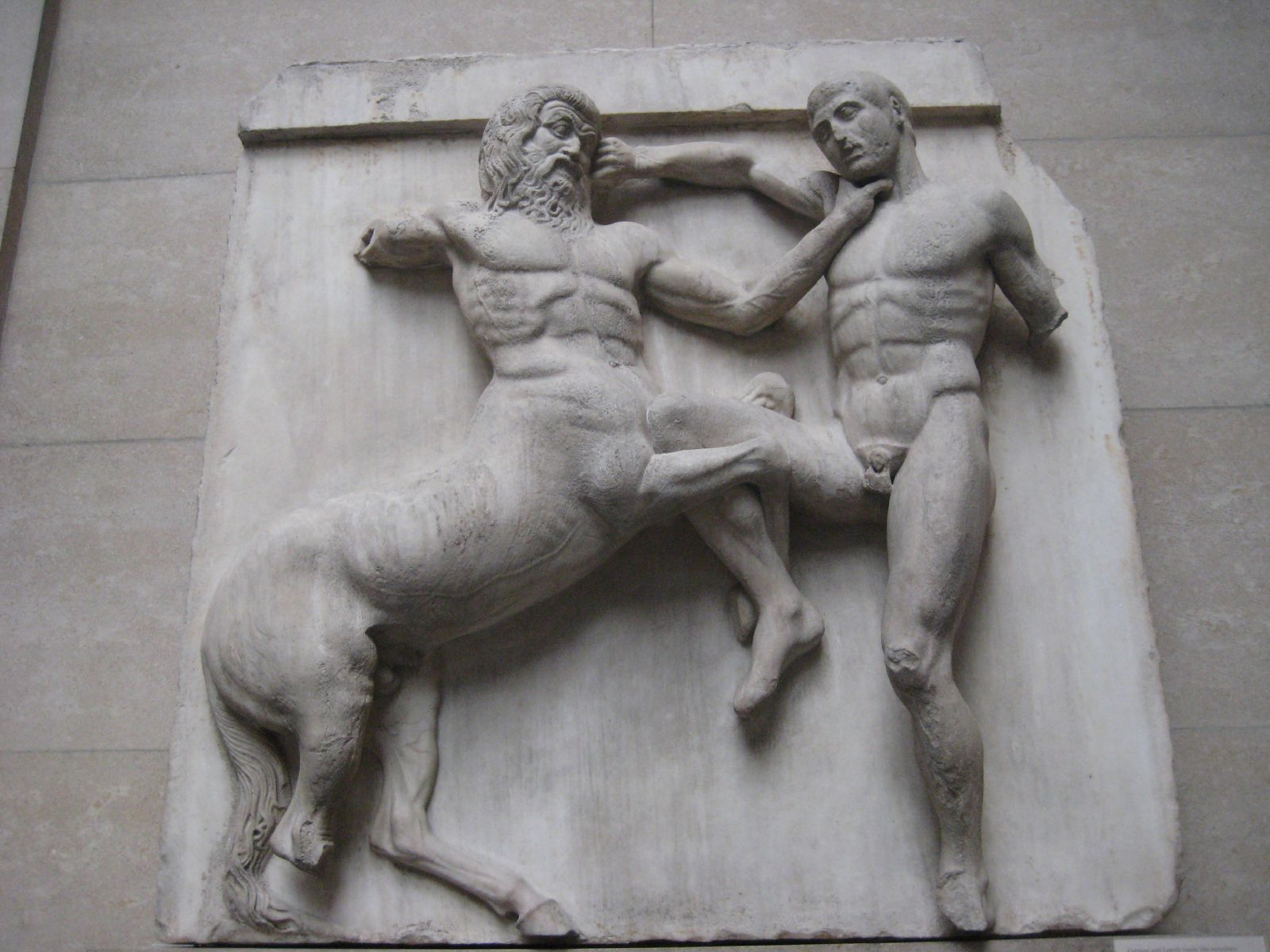
South XXXI.

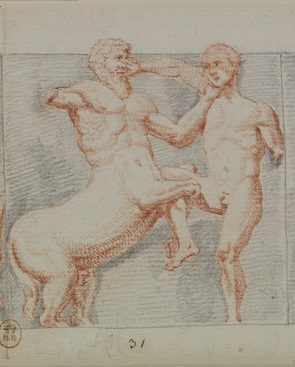
South XXXI drawn in 1674.

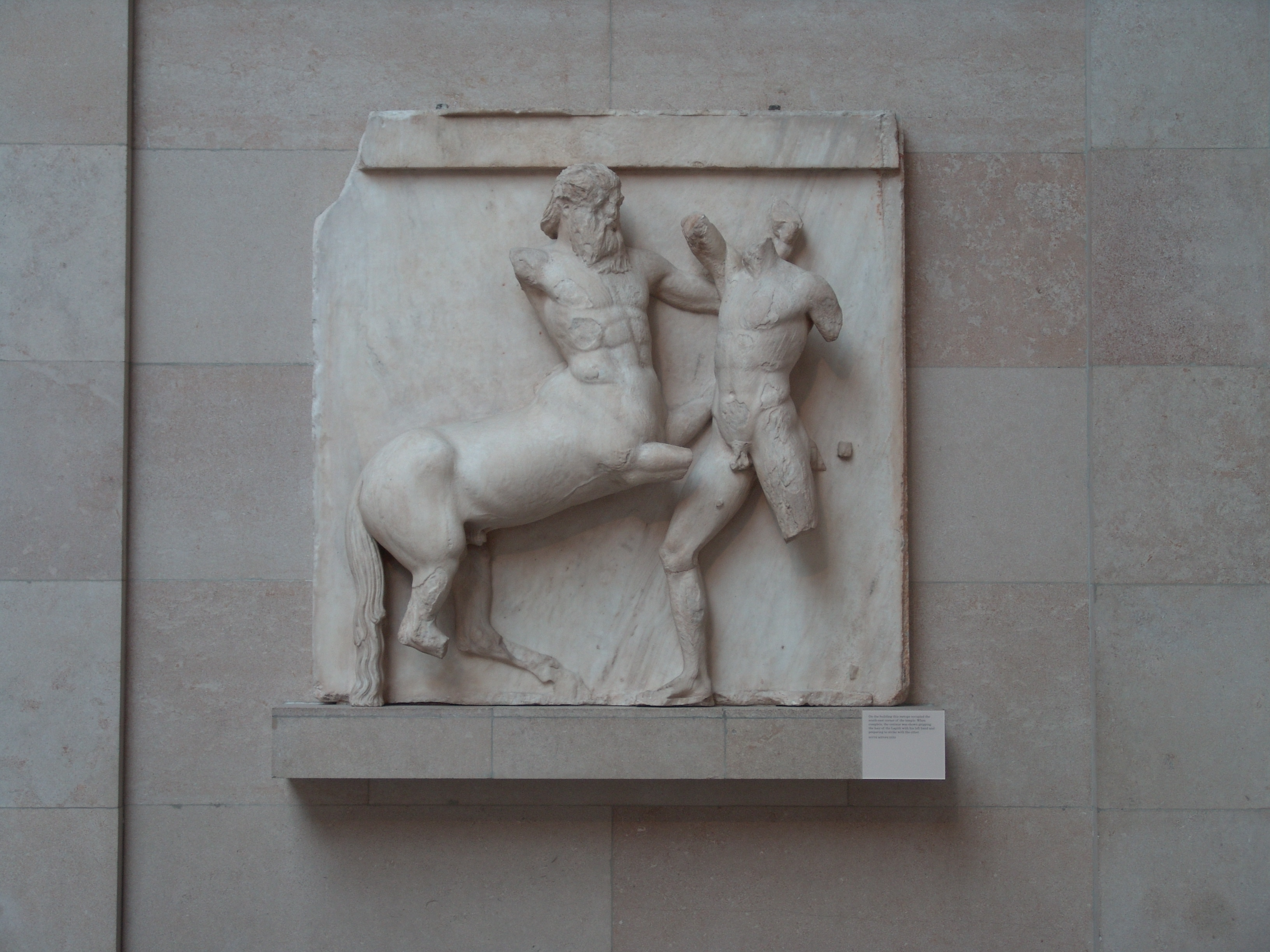
South XXXII.

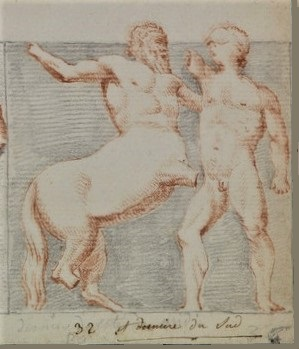
South XXXII drawn in 1674.

On the metope south XXX, Lapith on the right is kneeling. The Centaur plunges the hooves of the front legs into the thighs. The movement is still visible to the right limbs; the left limbs were broken. The metope south XXXI is also carved in a style a little old (severe) for this second half of the fifth century BC. The Centaur, on the left, seized the Lapith by the throat. Between his front legs, he holds the right leg of his opponent who enters his knee in the chest. The Lapithe tries to pull the shaggy hair of the Centaur. The positions are frozen; the anatomy is little rendered. The face of the Centaur is more grotesque than expressive. The very quality of the work left something to be desired: the right arm of the Centaur broke in antiquity and was replaced by a new one attached by ankles.

On the metope south XXXII, the Lapith on the right advances in a determined manner towards the Centaur on the left. He is pitched as if to protect himself. On the drawing attributed to Carrey, the right arm of Centaurus and left Lapithe were still present. The head of Lapithe also existed in 1674. A detail on the front made it possible to hypothesize that the Lapithe could have worn a Corinthian helmet. The position of Lapith's body and arms is reminiscent of those of Harmodios in the Tyrannonos group. In addition, this metope is the last in the southeast corner (near the most sacred façade). Therefore, this man is sometimes identified as Theseus, founder of Athenian democracy.

== See also ==
- Pediments of the Parthenon
- Parthenon Frieze

== Bibliography ==
- Paolo Enrico Arias, Problemi di scultura greca, Bologne, Casa Editrice Prof. Riccardo Patron, 1965.
- Giovanni Becatti, Problemi Fidiaci, Florence, Electa, 1951.
- Ernst Berger, Der Parthenon in Basel : Dokumentation zu den Metopen, t. Textband, Mayence, Philipp von Zabern, 1986.
- Margarete Bieber, « Reviewed Work: De Metopen des Parthenon. Katalog und Untersuchung by Frank Brommer », American Journal of Archaeology, vol. 72, no 42, October 1968.
- John Boardman, Greek Sculpture: The Classical Period a handbook, London, Thames and Hudson, 1985s.
- John Boardman, Greek Art, London, Thames and Hudson, 1985a.
- Boardman, J. (1995). La Sculpture grecque classique. Thames & Hudson, coll. « L'Univers de l'art ».
- Frank Brommer, Die Metopen des Parthenon, Mayence, Philipp von Zabern, 1967.
- Peter Oluf Brøndsted, Voyages dans la Grèce, accompagnés de recherches archéologiques et suivis d'un aperçu sur toutes les entreprises scientifiques qui ont eu lieu en Grèce depuis Pausanias jusqu'à nos jours, Paris, Firmin Didot, 1826-1830.
- Brian Cook, The Elgin Marbles, London, British Museum Publications Ltd, 1984,
- José Dörig, « Traces des Thraces sur le Parthénon », Museum Helveticum. Revue suisse pour l'étude de l'antiquité classique, Lausanne, 1978
- José Dörig, « Les métopes nord du Parthénon », in E. Berger, Der Parthenon-Kongress Basel. Referate une Berichte 4. bis 8. April 1982, Mayence, von Zabern, 1984
- Philipp Fehl, « The Rocks on the Parthenon Frieze », Journal of the Warburg and Courtauld Institutes, vol. 24, no 1/2, January–June 1961.
- Burkhard Fehr, « Die « gute » und die « schlechte » Ehefrau : Alkestis und Phaidra auf den Südmetopen des Parthenon », Hephaistos. Kritische Zeitschrift zu Theorie und Praxis der Archäologie und angrenzender Gebiete, no 4, 1982.
- Evelyn Byrd Harrison, « The Iconography of the Eponymous Heroes on the Parthenon and in the Agora », in Otto Mørkholm and Nancy Waggoner (ed.), Greek Numismatics and Archaeology : Essays in Honor of Margaret Thompson, Wetteren, Numismatique romaine, 1979.
- Bernard Holtzmann et Alain Pasquier, Histoire de l'art antique : l'Art grec, Paris, La Documentation française / Réunion des musées nationaux, coll. « Manuels de l'École du Louvre », 1998,
- Kristian Jeppesen, « Bild und Mythus an dem Parthenon », Acta Archaeologica, no 34, 1963.
- Philippe-Ernest Legrand, « Biographie de Louis-François-Sébastien Fauvel, antiquaire et consul (1753-1838) (suite) », Revue Archéologique, 3esérie, no XXX, janvier-juin 1897
- Adolf Michaelis, Der Parthenon, Leipzig, Breitkopf und Härtel, 1871
- Jenifer Neils, « "With Nobles Images on All Sides" : The Ionic Frieze of the Parthenon », in Jenifer Neils (ed.), The Parthenon : From Antiquity to the Present, Cambridge, Cambridge University Press, 2005
- Jenifer Neils, The Parthenon Frieze, Cambridge, Cambridge University Press, 2006
- Robert Ousterhout, « "Bestride the Very Peak of Heaven" : The Parthenon After Antiquity », in Jenifer Neils (ed.), The Parthenon : From Antiquity to the Present, Cambridge, Cambridge University Press, 2005
- Erich Pernice, « Über di mittleren Methoden der Südseite des Parthenon », Jahrbuch des Deutschen Archäologischen Instituts, no 10, 1895.
- Eugen Petersen, Die Kunst des Pheidias am Parthenon und zu Olympia, Berlin, Weidmann, 1873
- Charles Picard, Manuel d'archéologie grecque : la sculpture, volumes I et II, Paris, A. Picard, 1936 et 1939.
- Camillo Praschniker, Parthenonstudien, Augsbourg, Dr. B. Filser, 1928.
- Suzanne Ras, « Dans quel sens faut-il regarder les métopes Nord du Parthénon ? », Revue des Études Grecques, 57e série, no 269, 1944, p. 87-105
- Ridgway, Brunilde (1981). Fifth Century Styles in Greek Sculpture. Princeton.
- Carl Robert, « Die Ostmetopen des Parthenon », Archäologische Zeitung, no 42, 1884.
- Martin Robertson, « The South Metopes : Theseus and Daidalos », in E. Berger, Der Parthenon-Kongress Basel. Referate une Berichte 4. bis 8. April 1982, Mayence, von Zabern, 1984
- Rolley, Claude (1999). La Sculpture grecque, vol. II : La période classique. Manuels d'art et d'archéologie antiques, Picard.
- William Saint-Clair, Lord Elgin and the Marbles, Oxford, Oxford University Press, 1983 (1st ed. 1967),
- Katherine A. Schwab, « Celebrations of Victory : The Metopes of the Parthenon », in Jenifer Neils (ed.), The Parthenon : From Antiquity to the Present, Cambridge, Cambridge University Press, 2005
- Bernard Schweitzer, « Pheidias der Parthenon-Meister », Jahrbuch des Deutschen Archäologischen Instituts, no LV, 1940.
- Erika Simon, « Versuch einer Deutung der Südmetopen des Parthenon », Jahrbuch des Deutschen Archäologischen Instituts, no 90, 1975.
- Robert Spenser Stanier, « The Cost of the Parthenon », Journal of Hellenic Studies, vol. 73, 1953
- Frantz Studniczka, « Neues über die Parthenonmetopen », Neue Jahrbücher für das klassische Altertum, Geschichte und Deutsche Literatur, no 29, 1912.
- Frantz Studniczka, « Neues über die Parthenonmetopen », Neue Jahrbücher für Wissenschaft und Jugendbildung, no 5, 1929.
- Michaelis A. Tiverios, « Observations on the East Metopes of the Parthenon », American Journal of Archaeology, no 86, 1982.
- Alessia Zambon, « Louis-François-Sébastien Fauvel et la constitution de la collection Choiseul-Gouffier », dans Odile Cavalier, Le Voyage de Grèce du comte de Choiseul-Gouffier, Le Pontet, A. Barthélemy, 2007

== See also ==
- Elgin Marbles
- Ancient Greek art
