= Aglaureion =

Ancient shrine in Athens, Greece

Coordinates: 37.9717°N 23.7286°E

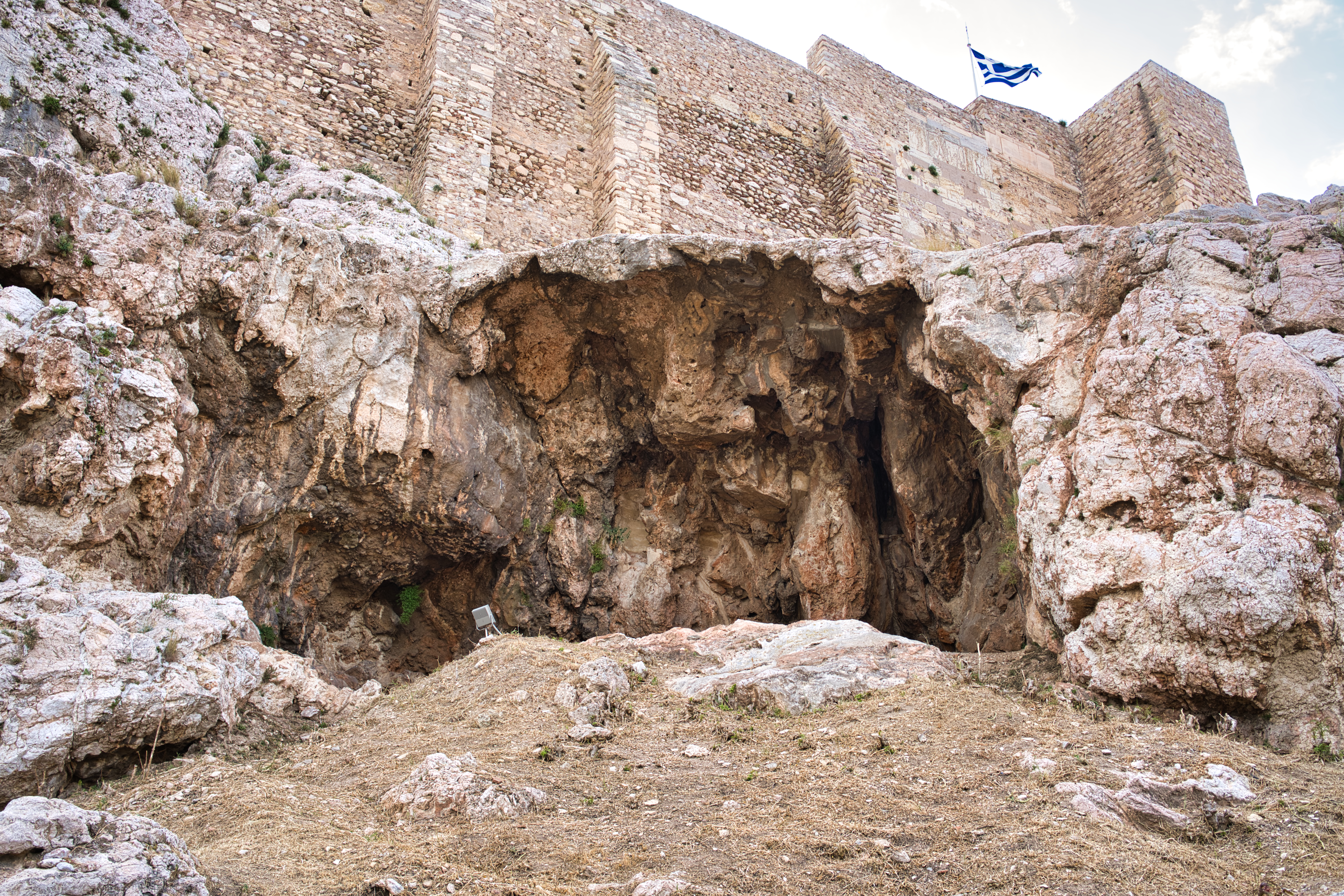
View of the Aglaureion

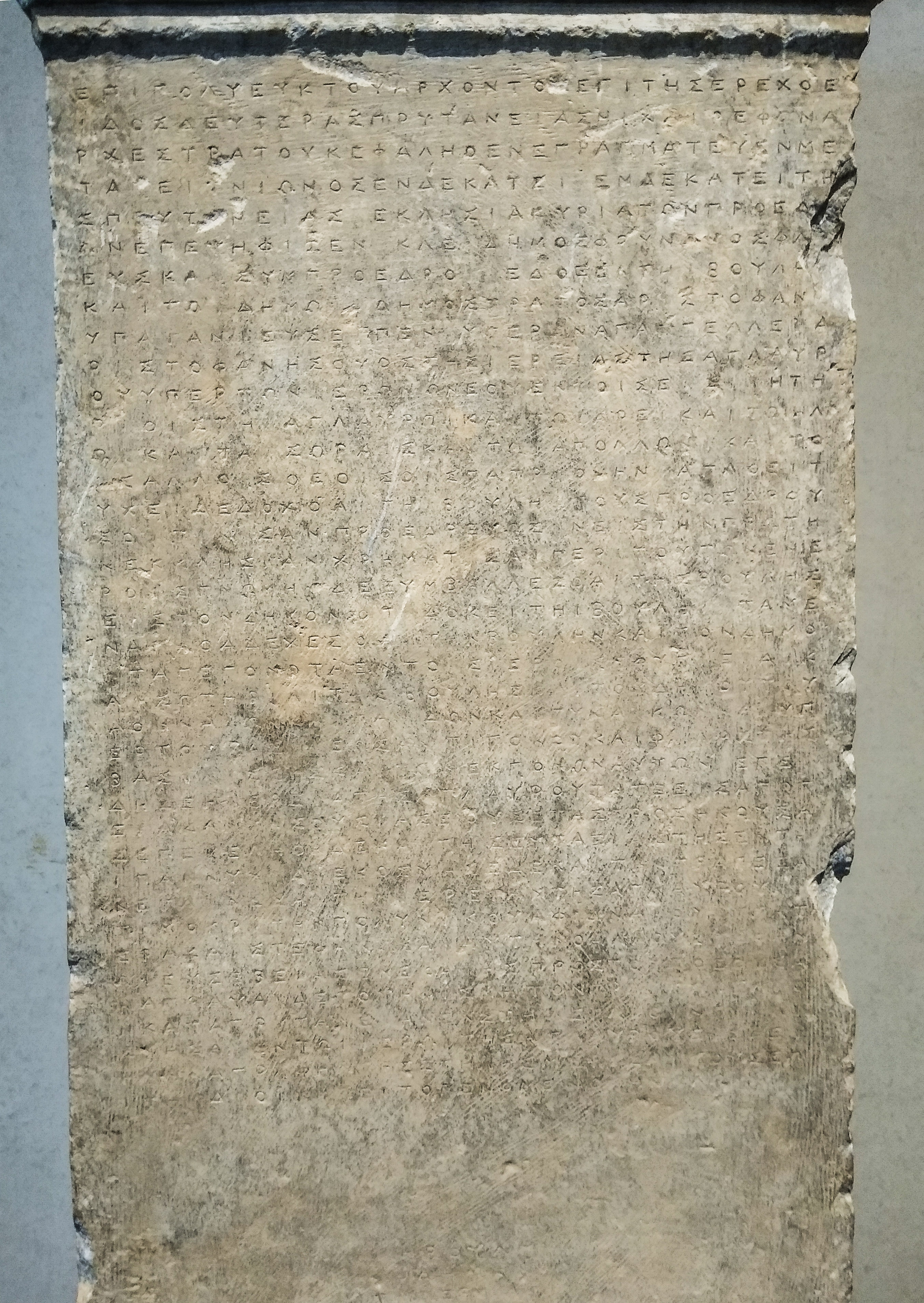
Stele discovered at the Aglaureion, now in the Acropolis Museum

The Aglaureion (Greek: Αγλαύρειο), or the Sanctuary of Aglauros, was an ancient sanctuary located in the Acropolis in Athens, Greece. It was dedicated to Aglauros, a Greek mythological figure who was the daughter of King Cecrops and the sister of Erysichthon, Pandrosus, and Herse. The sanctuary was believed to be the site where Aglauros had sacrificed herself to protect the city from invasion.

== Discovery ==
In 1980, during excavations of the Peripatos, archaeologists found on the eastern slope of the Acropolis an honorary stele for Aglauros, dating to the 3rd century BC. It is believed the stele once stood as part of the peribolos of the Aglaureion. The stele is now held by the Acropolis Museum (inventory number Ακρ. 13372). The site had been incorrectly ascribed to other sanctuaries by archaeologists before.

== See also ==
- Arrhephoria
- Plynteria
