= Herse (daughter of Cecrops) =

Athenian princess, daughter of Cecrops

- Princess of Athens
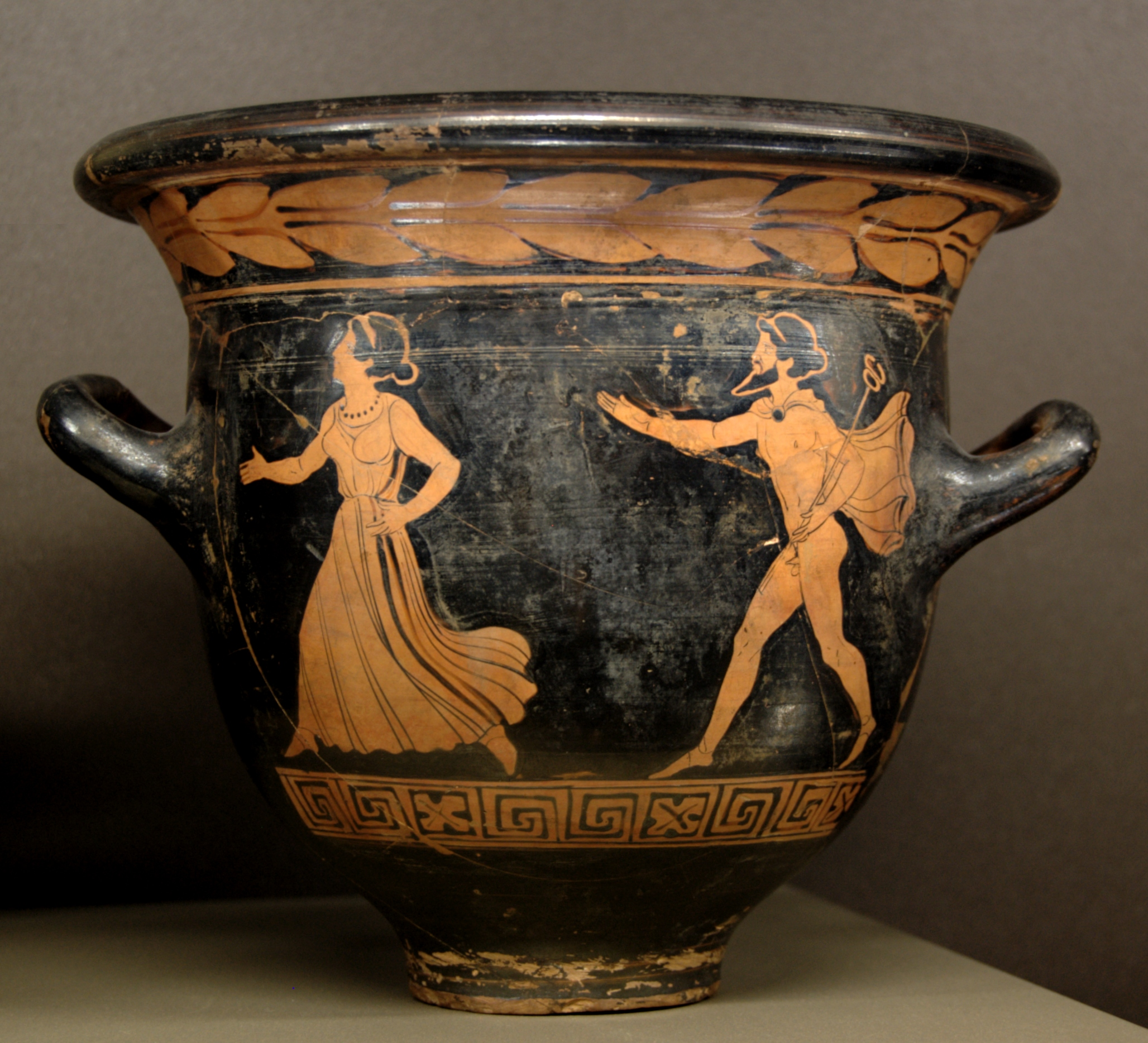
- Hermes pursuing a woman, probably Herse, Lucanian red-figure bell-krater, ca. 390–380 BC, Louvre (G 494).
- Abode: Athens

Genealogy
- Parents: Cecrops I and Aglaurus
- Siblings: Aglaurus, Pandrosus, and Erysichthon
- Consort: Hermes
- Offspring: Cephalus

Herse (Note: Ancient Greek: Ἕρση, Hérsē, lit. 'dew') was a figure in Greek mythology, the Athenian princess as the daughter of King Cecrops of Athens and Aglaurus, daughter of King Actaeus.

== Family ==
Herse was the sister to Aglauros and Pandrosos. Cephalus of Athens is the son of Hermes and Herse, who married Eos, and gave birth to Tithonus (not to be confused with Tithonus of Troy). According to Marcellus of Side, as recorded in a Greek inscription, she was by Hermes the mother of Ceryx.

== Mythology ==
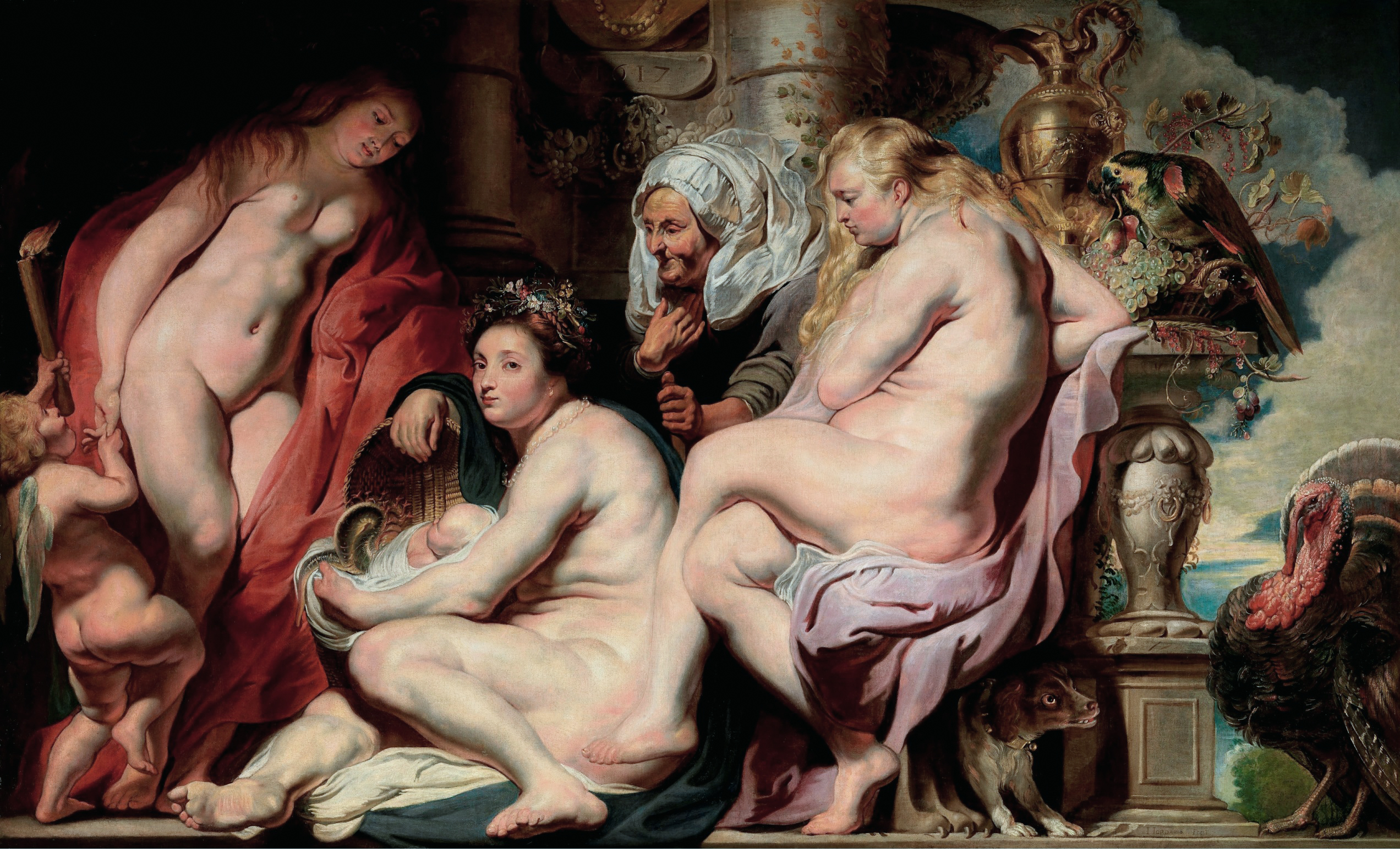
Les Filles de Cécrops découvrant l'enfant Érichthonios by Jacob Jordaens (1617)

=== Erichthonius ===
According to the Bibliotheca, when Hephaestus unsuccessfully attempted to rape Athena, she wiped his semen off her leg with wool and threw it on the ground, impregnating Gaia. Athena wished to make the resulting infant Erichthonius immortal and to raise it, so she gave it to three sisters, Herse, Aglauros and Pandrosos, in a willow basket and warned them to never open it. Aglauros and Herse disobeyed her and opened the basket which contained the infant and future king, Erichthonius, who was somehow mixed or intertwined with a snake. The sight caused Herse and Aglauros to go insane and they jumped to their deaths off the Acropolis. Shrines were constructed for Herse and Aglauros on the Acropolis.

An alternative version of the story is that, while Athena was gone bringing a limestone mountain from the Pallene peninsula to use in the Acropolis, the sisters, minus Pandrosos again, opened the box with Erichthonius inside. A crow witnessed the opening and flew away to tell Athena, who fell into a rage and dropped the mountain (now Mt. Lykabettos). Once again, Herse and Aglauros went insane and threw themselves to their deaths off the cliffs of the Acropolis. This story supposedly inspired an ancient ritual in Athens: "The Festival of the Dew Carriers" or Arrhephoria.

=== Jealous sister ===
Some authors, such as Ovid in his Metamorphoses and Ars Amatoria, wrote a different end for Herse and Aglauros. Ovid tells in Book 2 of his Metamorphoses that Erichthonius was born without a mother. Pallas Athena (better known as Athena, Minerva is her Roman name) placed him in a willow basket and told the sisters not to look on the mysteries. Two daughters, Herse and Pandrosos obeyed, but Aglauros looked and saw the child lying next to a great snake. Corone, the crow, told Athena, who turned her feathers from white to black for her pains. Later in Book 2, Hermes (Mercury in Roman mythology) is in Athens and sees a festival to Athena. He falls in love with Herse and goes to her house to ask for her hand. Aglauros agrees to give Herse his message for the price of gold. Athena sees all of this and goes to the house of Envy and orders the goddess to poison Aglauros. Aglauros, who begins to waste away with jealousy, blocks the passage to Herse's room and refuses to move. Hermes, angry at Aglauros for breaking her promise, changes her into a black marble statue.

== Gallery ==
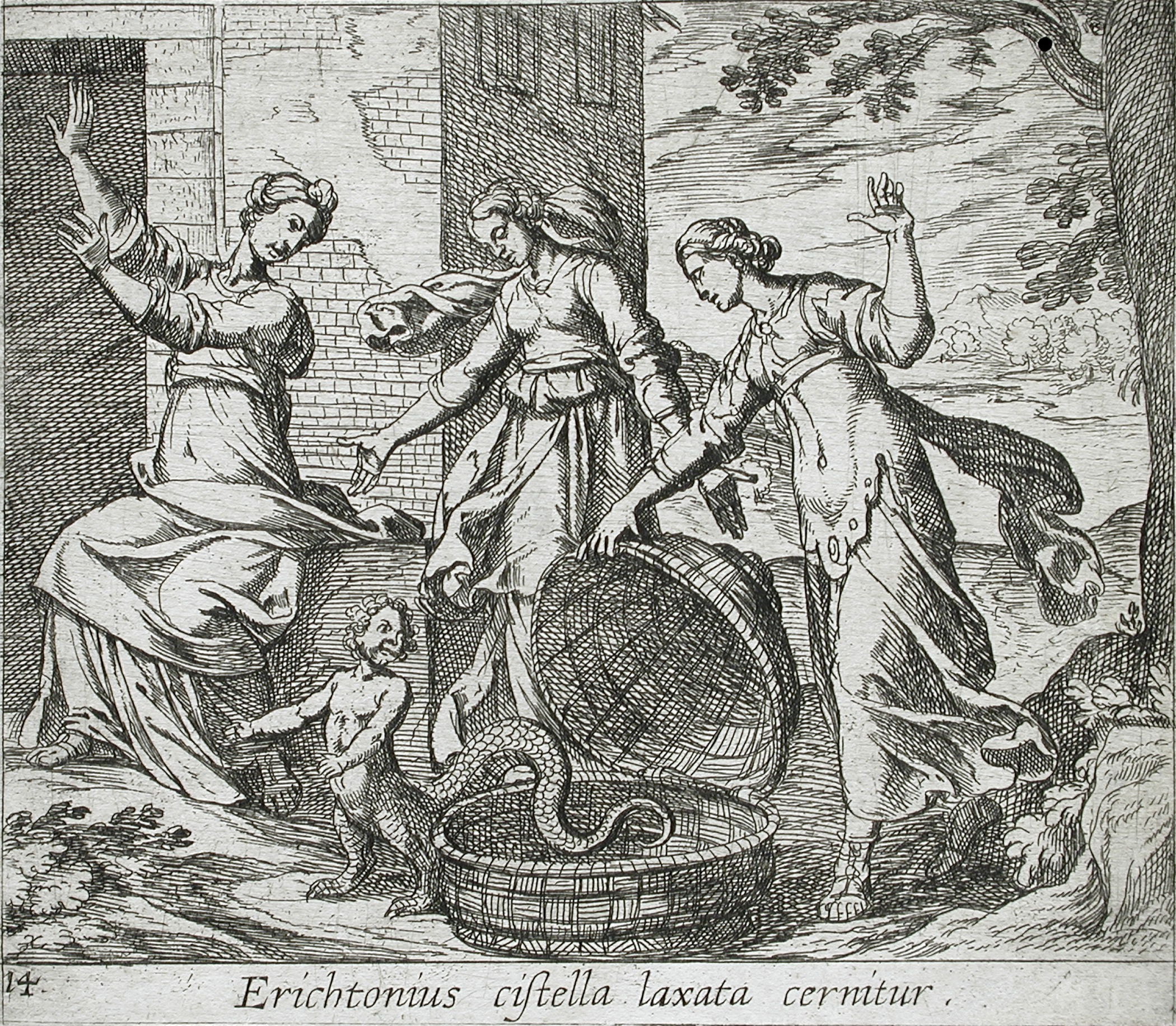
Erichthonius Released from His Basket by Antonio Tempesta (1606)

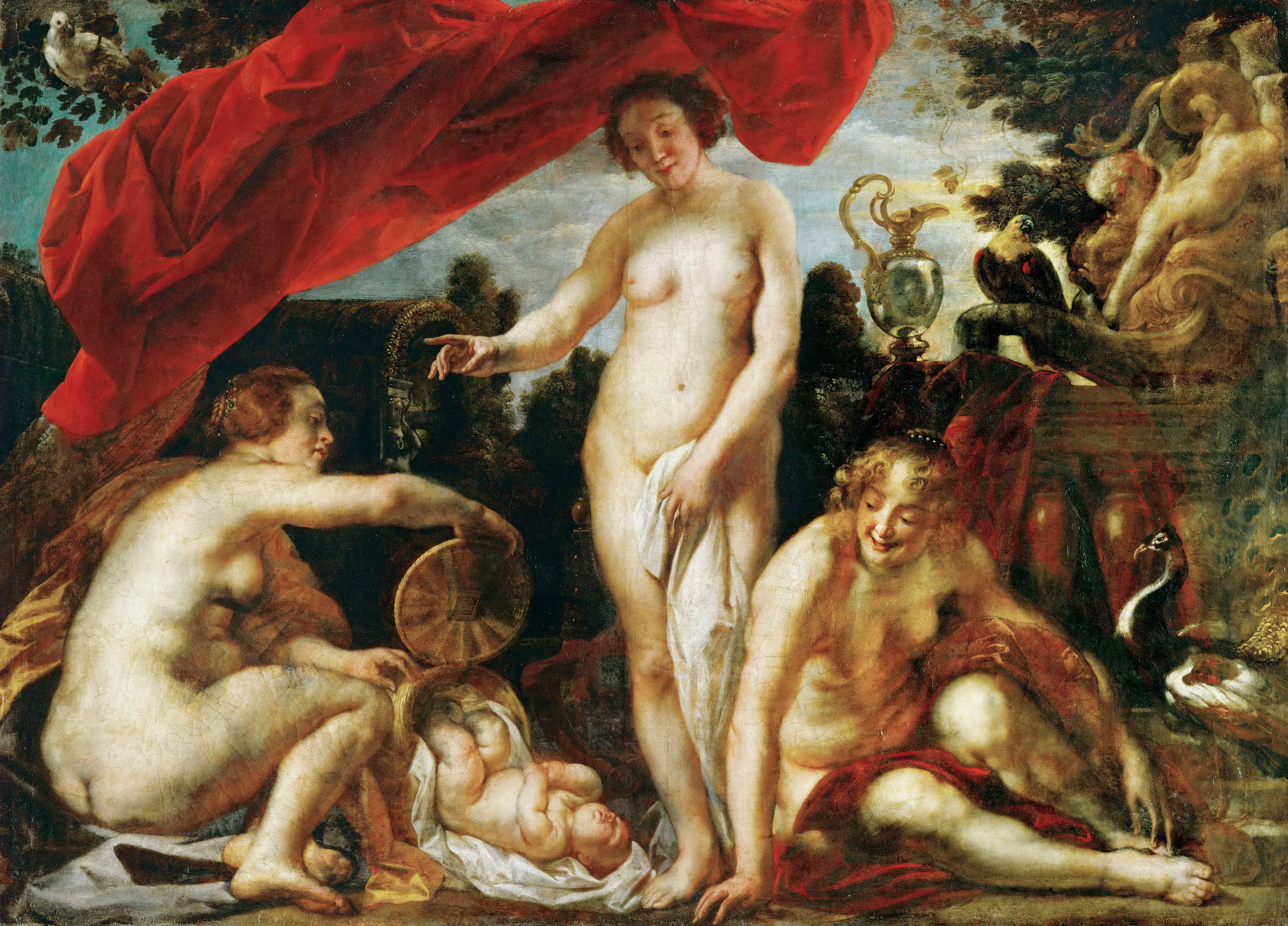
Daughters of Kekrops Finding Erichthonios by Jacob Jordaens (1640)

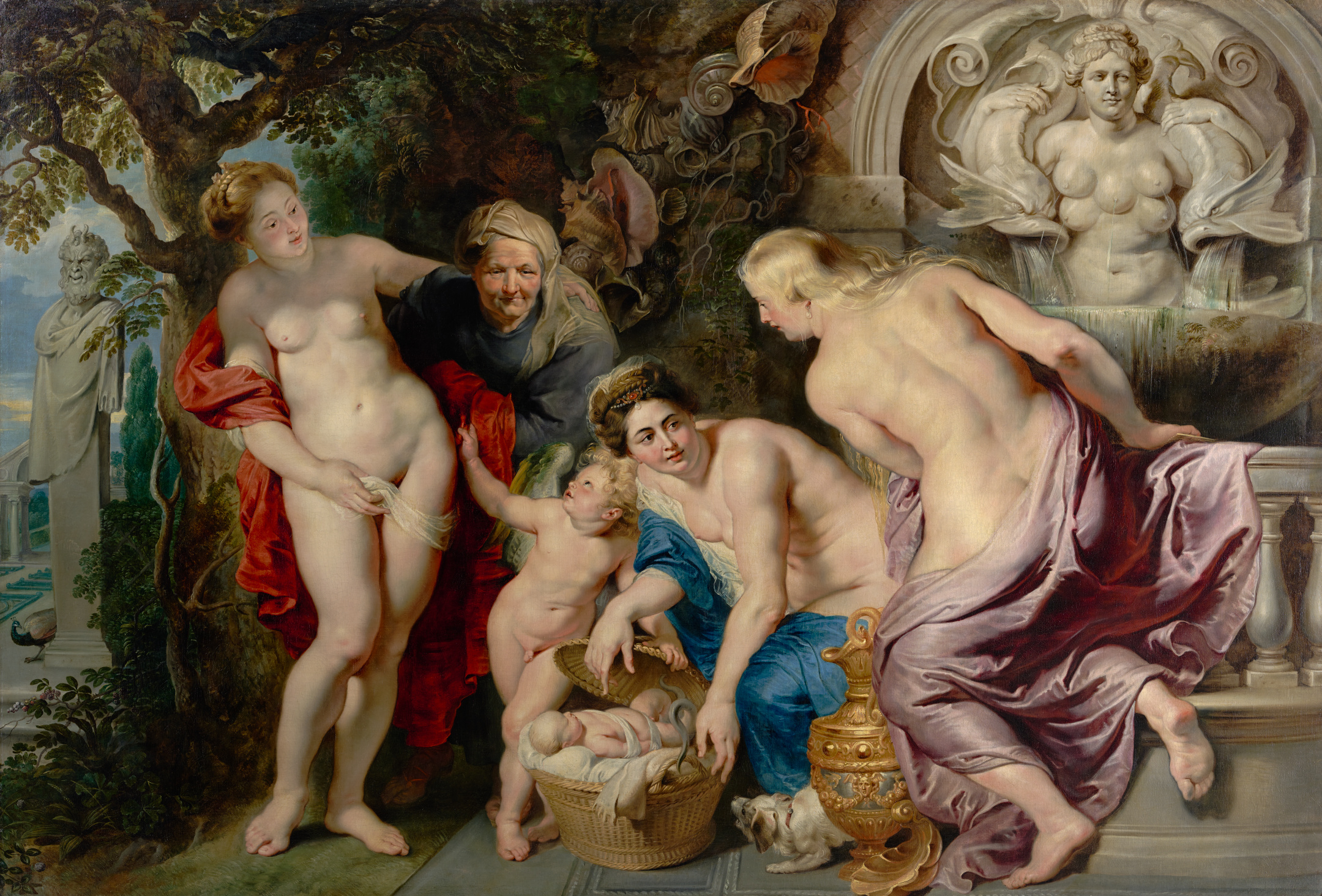
The Discovery of the Child Erichthonius by Peter Paul Rubens (circa 1615)

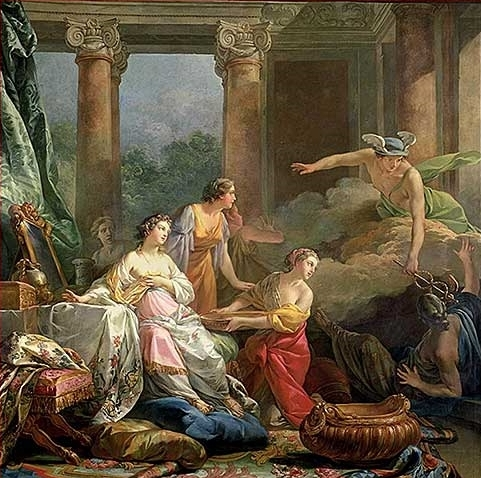
Mercury, Herse and Aglauros by Jean-Baptiste Marie Pierre (1763)

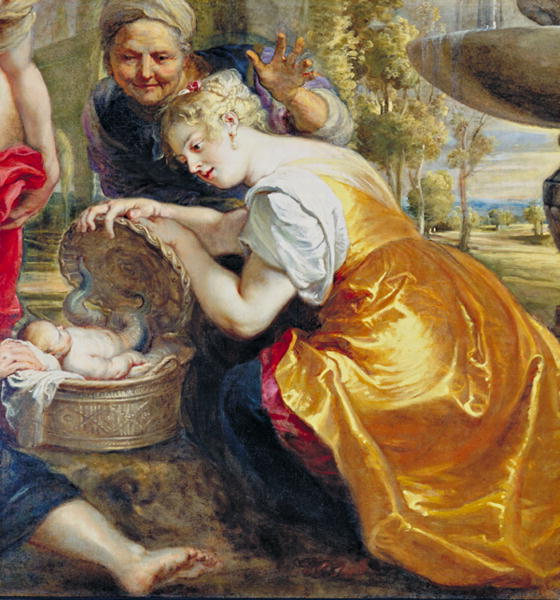
Finding of Erichthonius by Peter Paul Rubens (between 1632 and 1633)

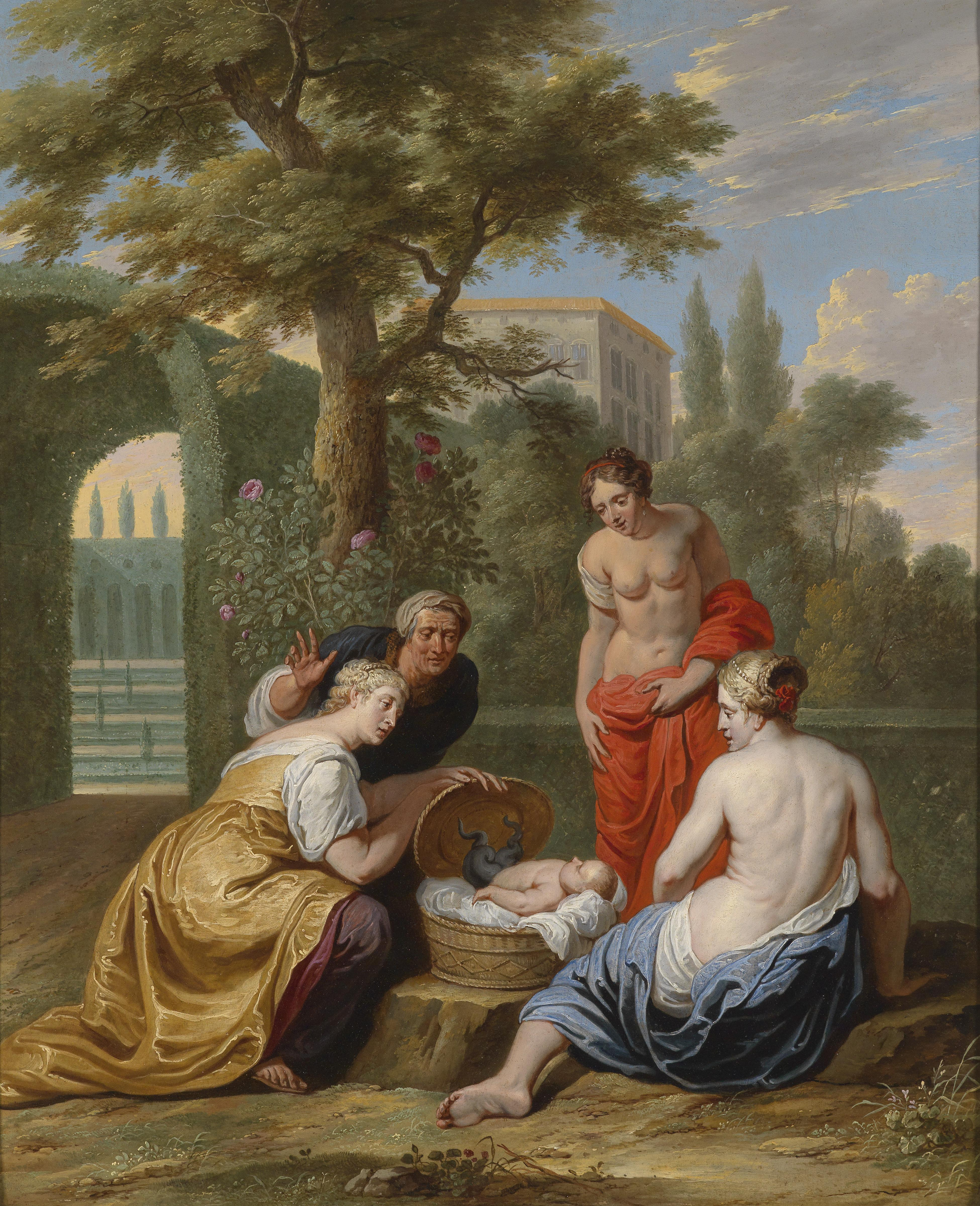
The finding of the infant Erichthonius by Cecrops's daughters by Willem van Herp (circa 1650))

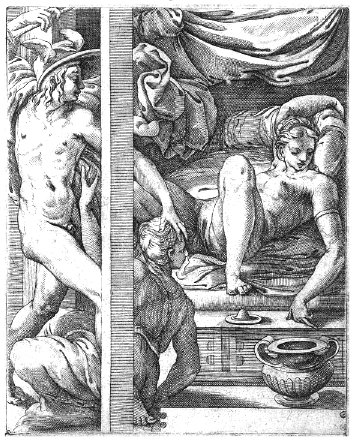
Mercury and Herse from the series "Götterlieben" (Prinmaking), Hamburg.
