= Erichthonius (son of Hephaestus) =

Legendary king of Athens

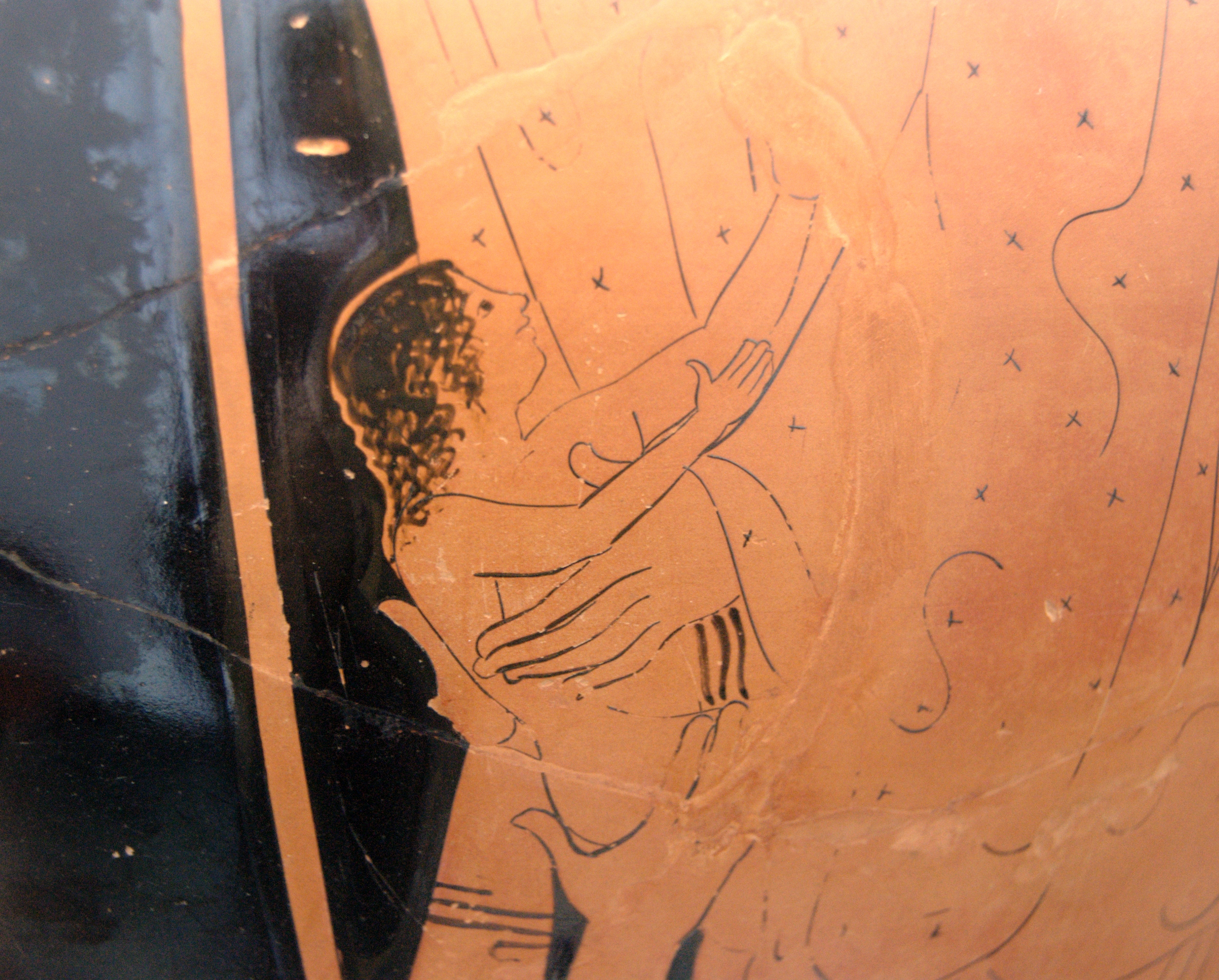
Birth of Erichthonius: Athena receives the baby Erichthonius from the hands of the earth mother Gaia, Attic red-figure stamnos, 470–460 BC, Staatliche Antikensammlungen (Inv. 2413)

In Greek mythology, King Erichthonius (/ərɪkˈθoʊniəs/; Ancient Greek: Ἐριχθόνιος, romanized: Erikhthónios) was a legendary early ruler of ancient Athens. According to some myths, he was autochthonous (born of the soil, or Earth) and adopted or raised by the goddess Athena. Early Greek texts do not distinguish between him and Erechtheus, his grandson, but by the fourth century BC, during Classical times, they are distinct figures.

== Etymology ==
Erichthonius of uncertain etymology is possibly related to a pre-Greek form *Erekt^{y}eu-. The connection of Ἐριχθόνιος with ἐρέχθω, "shake" is a late folk-etymology; other folk-etymologies include ἔριον, erion, "wool" or ἔρις, eris, "strife"+ χθών chthôn, "earth". (Note: Beekes (2009) Ἐριχθόνιος, suggested a pre-Greek proto-form *Erekt^{y}eu-.)

== Mythology ==
=== Birth ===
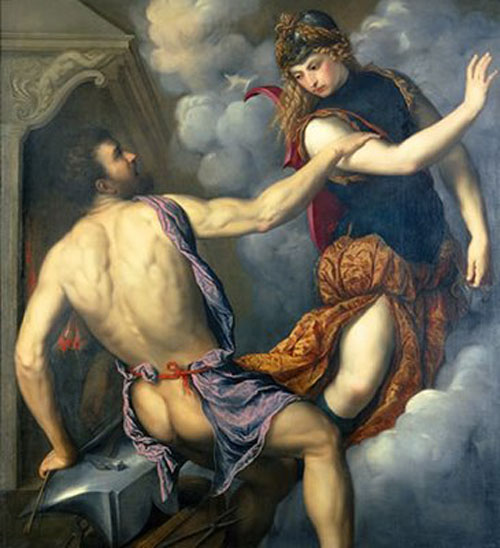
Athena Scorning the Advances of Hephaestus, Paris Bordone, between c. 1555~1560

According to the Bibliotheca, Athena visited the smith-god Hephaestus to request some weapons, but Hephaestus, overcome by desire, tried to seduce her in his workshop. Determined to maintain her virginity, Athena fled, pursued by Hephaestus. He caught Athena and tried to rape her, but she fought him off. During the struggle, his semen fell on her thigh, and Athena, in disgust, wiped it away with a scrap of wool (ἔριον, erion) and flung it to the earth (χθών, chthôn). As she fled, Erichthonius was born from the semen that fell to the earth. Athena, wishing to raise the child in secret, placed him in a small box and then made sure no one would ever find out by giving him away.

Athena gave the box to the three daughters (Herse, Aglaurus and Pandrosus) of Cecrops, the king of Athens, and warned them never to look inside. Pandrosus obeyed, but Herse and Aglaurus, overcome with curiosity, opened the box containing the infant and future-king, Erichthonius ("troubles born from the earth" following another etymology). (Sources are unclear regarding how many sisters participated.) The sisters were terrified by what they saw in the box: either a snake coiled around an infant, or an infant that was half-human and half-serpent. They went insane and threw themselves off the Acropolis. Other accounts state that the snake killed them.

An alternative version of the story recounts that Athena left the box with the daughters of Cecrops while she went to fetch a limestone mountain from Pallene to use in the Acropolis. While she was away, Aglaurus and Herse opened the box. A crow saw them open the box, and flew away to tell Athena, who fell into a rage and dropped the mountain she was carrying, which became Mount Lycabettus. As in the first version, Herse and Aglaurus went insane and threw themselves to their deaths off a cliff.

=== Reign ===
When he grew up, Erichthonius drove out Amphictyon, who had usurped the throne from Cranaus twelve years earlier, and became king of Athens. He married Praxithea, a naiad, with whom he had a son, Pandion I. During this time, Athena frequently protected him. He founded the Panathenaic Festival in the honor of Athena, and set up a wooden statue of her on the Acropolis. According to the Parian Chronicle, he taught his people to yoke horses and use them to pull chariots.

It was said that Erichthonius was lame of his feet and that he consequently invented the quadriga, or four-horse chariot, to get around more easily. He is said to have competed often as a chariot driver in games. Zeus was said to have been so impressed with his skill that he raised him to the heavens to become the constellation of the Charioteer (Auriga) after his death.

The snake is his symbol, and he is represented in the statue of Athena in the Parthenon as the snake hidden behind her shield. The most sacred building on the Acropolis of Athens, the Erechtheum, is dedicated to Erichthonius.

Erichthonius was succeeded by his son Pandion I.

Regnal titles
Preceded by Amphictyon	King of Athens; 50	Succeeded by Pandion I

== Gallery ==
Erichthonius of Athens in art

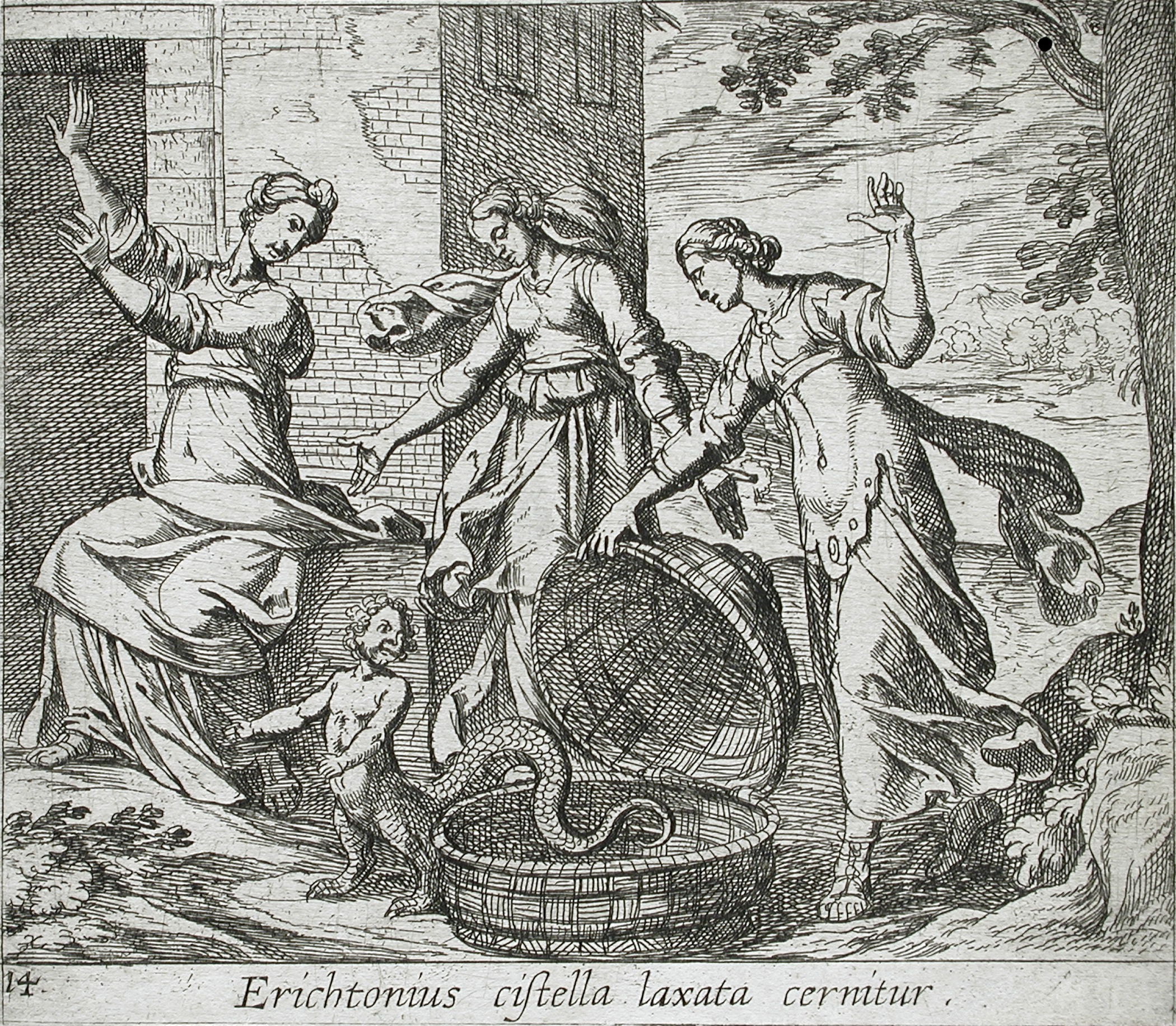
Erichthonius Released from His Basket by Antonio Tempesta (1606)

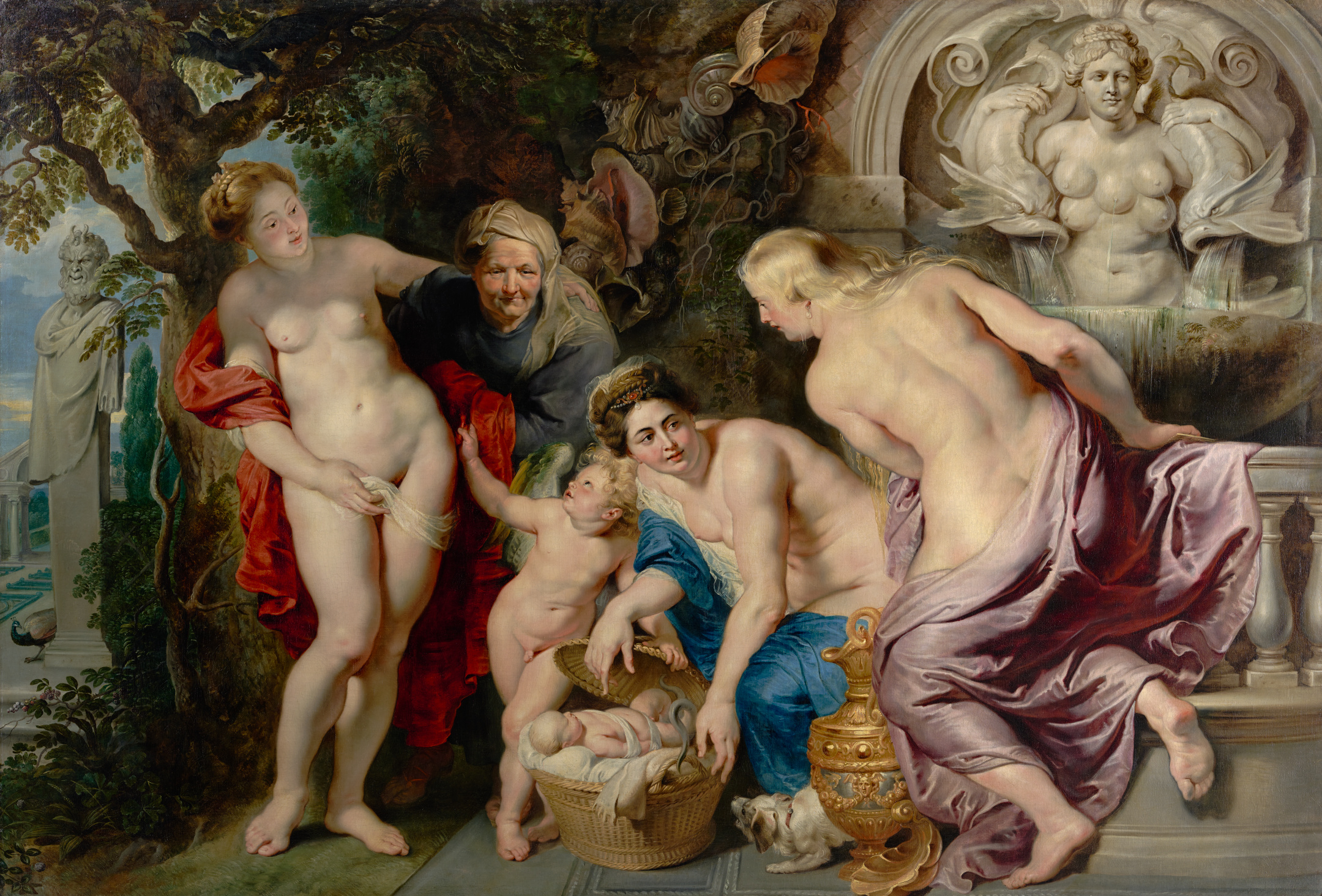
The Discovery of the Child Erichthonius by Peter Paul Rubens (circa 1615)

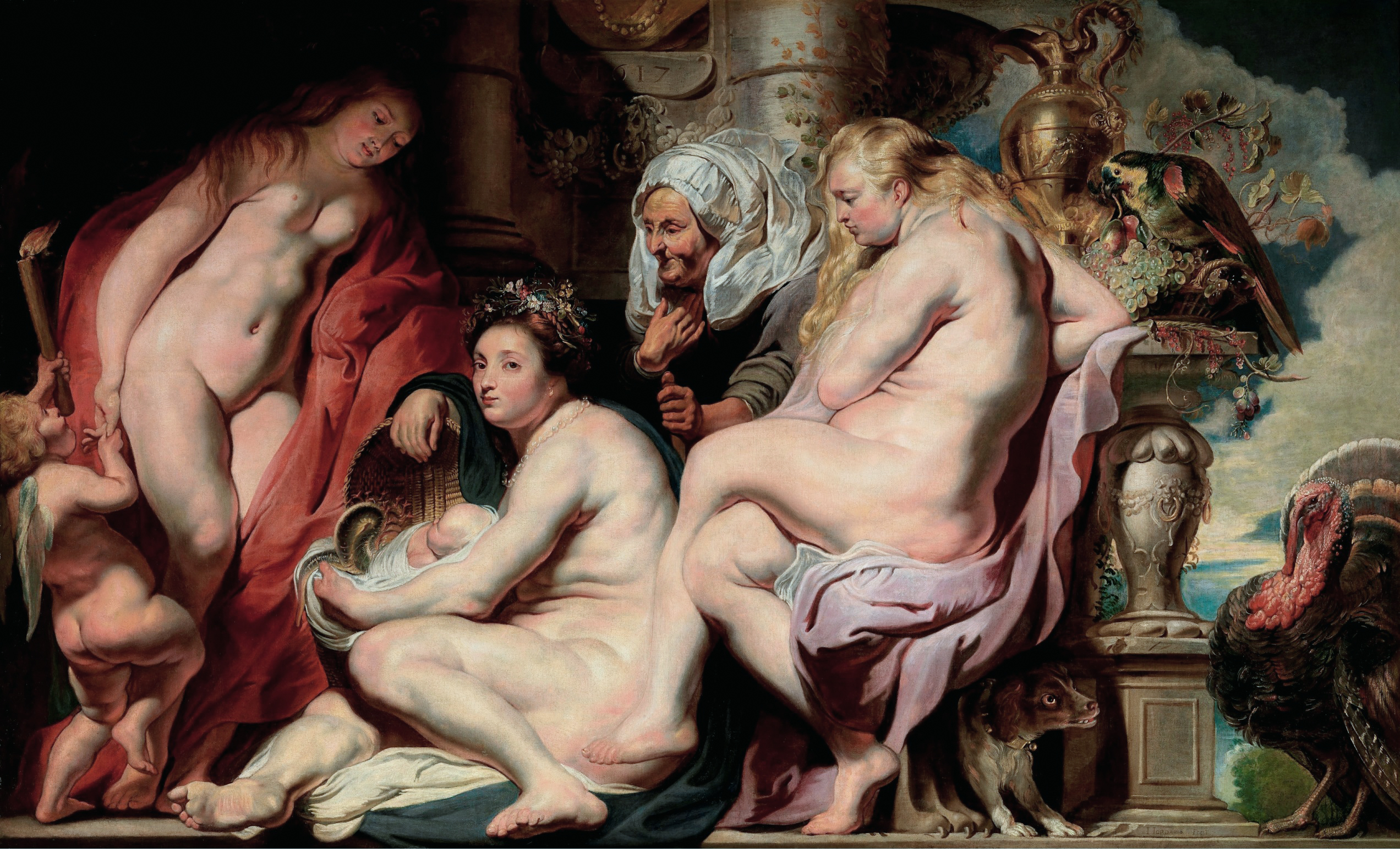
The finding of the infant Erichthonius by Cecrops's daughters by Jacob Jordaens (1617)

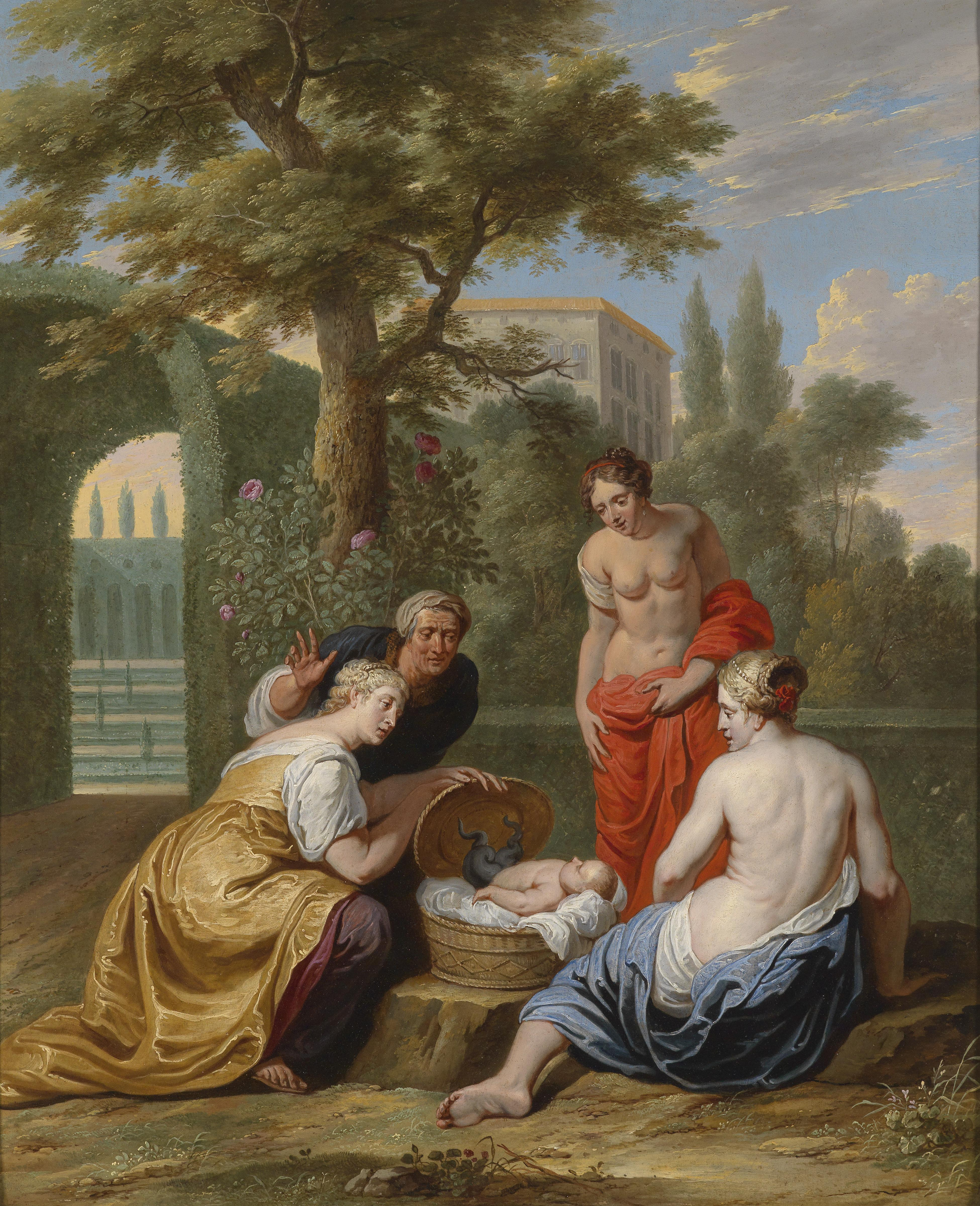
The finding of the infant Erichthonius by Cecrops's daughters by Willem van Herp (circa 1650))

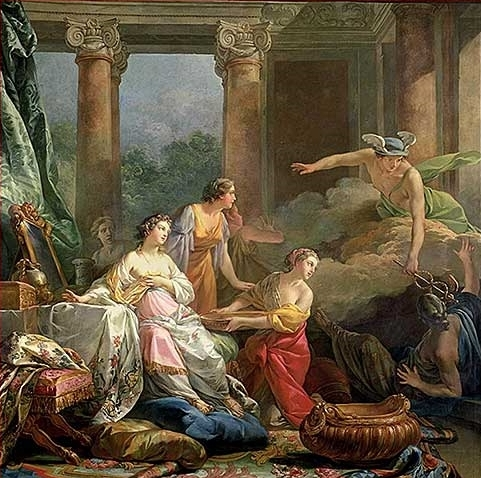
Mercury, Herse and Aglauros by Jean-Baptiste Marie Pierre (1763)

== Sources ==
- Apollodorus, Apollodorus, The Library, with an English Translation by Sir James George Frazer, F.B.A., F.R.S. in 2 Volumes. Cambridge, MA, Harvard University Press; London, William Heinemann Ltd. 1921. Online version at the Perseus Digital Library.
- Beekes, S. P., Etymological Dictionary of Greek, 2 vols. Leiden: Brill, 2009.
- Graves, Robert; The Greek Myths, Moyer Bell Ltd; Unabridged edition (December 1988), ISBN 0-918825-80-6.
- Homer, The Iliad with an English Translation by A.T. Murray, Ph.D. in two volumes. Cambridge, MA., Harvard University Press; London, William Heinemann, Ltd. 1924. Online version at the Perseus Digital Library.
- Smith, William; Dictionary of Greek and Roman Biography and Mythology, London (1873). Erichthonius
