= Alcippe (daughter of Ares) =

Greek mitology character, daughter of the God of war Ares

In Greek mythology, Alcippe (Ancient Greek: Ἀλκίππη, romanized: Alkippē, lit. 'strength of the horse' or 'mighty mare') is daughter of Ares and the mortal princess Aglauros.

== Mythology ==
According to myth, she was attacked and, in some versions, raped on the beach of Athens by Halirrhothius, a son of the god of the sea, Poseidon.

Her father, Ares, came to her aid and killed Halirrhothius. Poseidon demanded justice for his son, and Ares was judged by the Court of the Gods in what, according to the myth, was the first trial in history. The trial took place on the Areopagus, a hill adjacent to the Acropolis of Athens which took its name from this event.

Ares claimed to have killed Halirrhothius to defend/avenge his daughter from rape, and Alcippe confirmed her father's statement. The gods believed them and, as there were no witnesses to the contrary, completely acquitted Ares. According to Panyasis however, it seems that Ares is condemned to serve among mortals, probably as a price for this murder.
