= Aglaurus, daughter of Cecrops =

Ancient Greek mythological figure

Aglaurus
- Princess of Athens
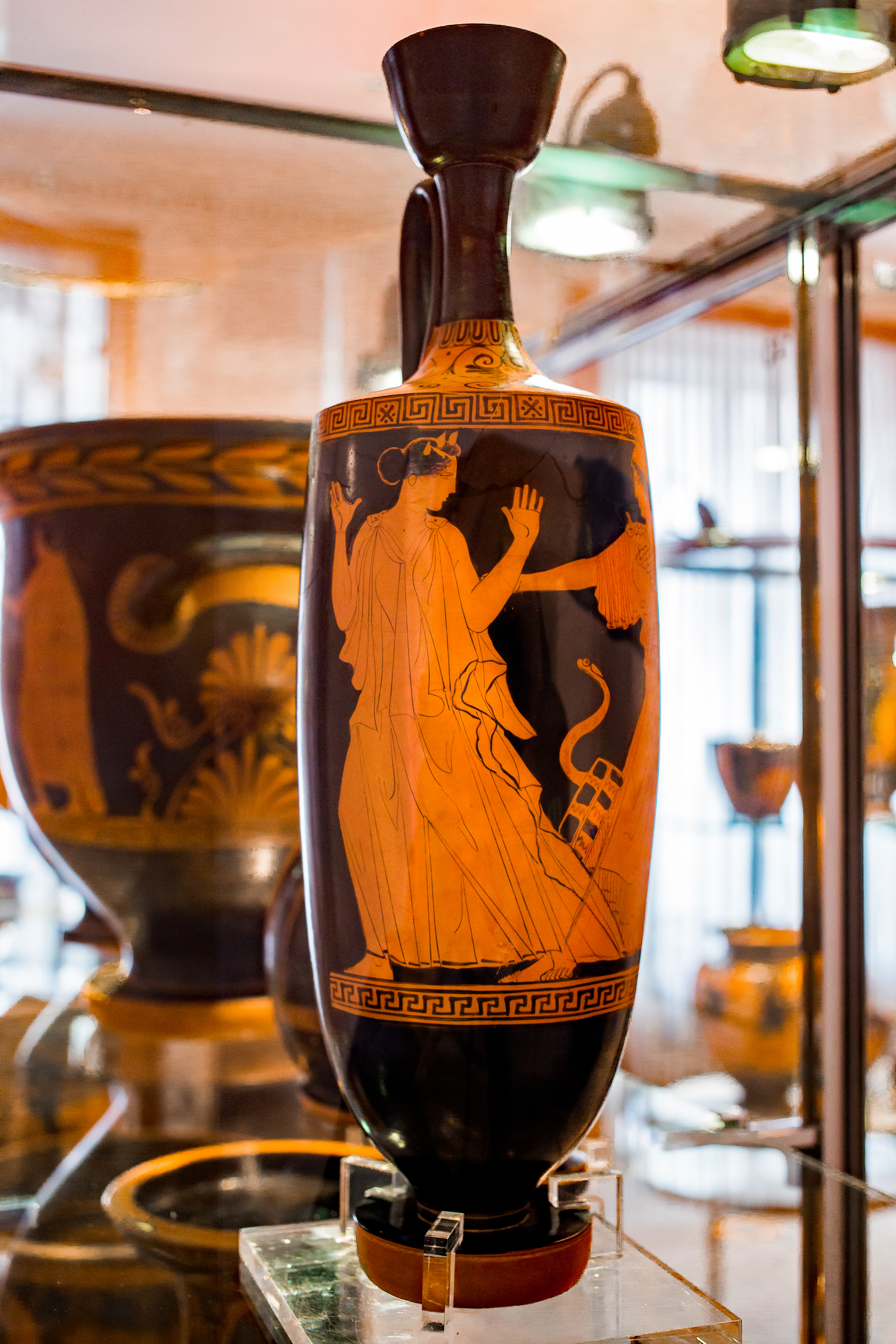
- Aglaurus pursued by Athena on an Attic red-figure lekythos, c. 435-430 BC, Basel.
- Abode: Athens

Genealogy
- Parents: Cecrops I and Aglaurus
- Siblings: Herse, Pandrosus, and Erysichthon
- Consort: Ares, Hermes
- Offspring: Alcippe, Ceryx

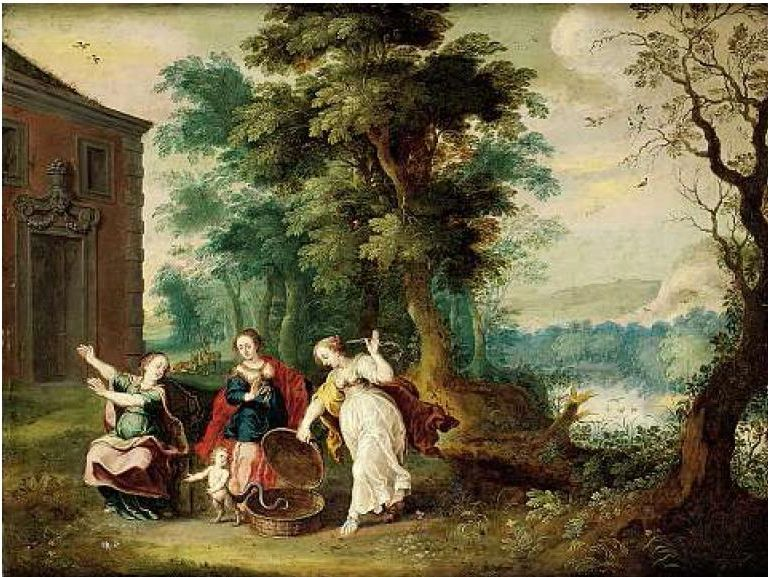
Aglaurus and her two sisters finding Erichthonius. Painting by Jasper van der Lanen, c. 1620.

In Greek mythology, Aglaurus (/əˈɡlɔːrəs/; Ancient Greek: Ἄγλαυρος) or Agraulus (/əˈɡrɔːləs/; Ἄγραυλος) was the daughter of the Attic king Cecrops I and Aglaurus, the daughter of Actaeus. By the god Ares, she was the mother of Alcippe.

== Family ==
Aglaurus was the daughter of King Cecrops and another Aglaurus, daughter of King Actaeus. She was the sister of Herse, Pandrosus and possibly, Erysichthon. Aglaurus had two offspring by two different gods, Alcippe (with Ares) and Ceryx (with Hermes). There were numerous versions of her myth.

== Mythology ==
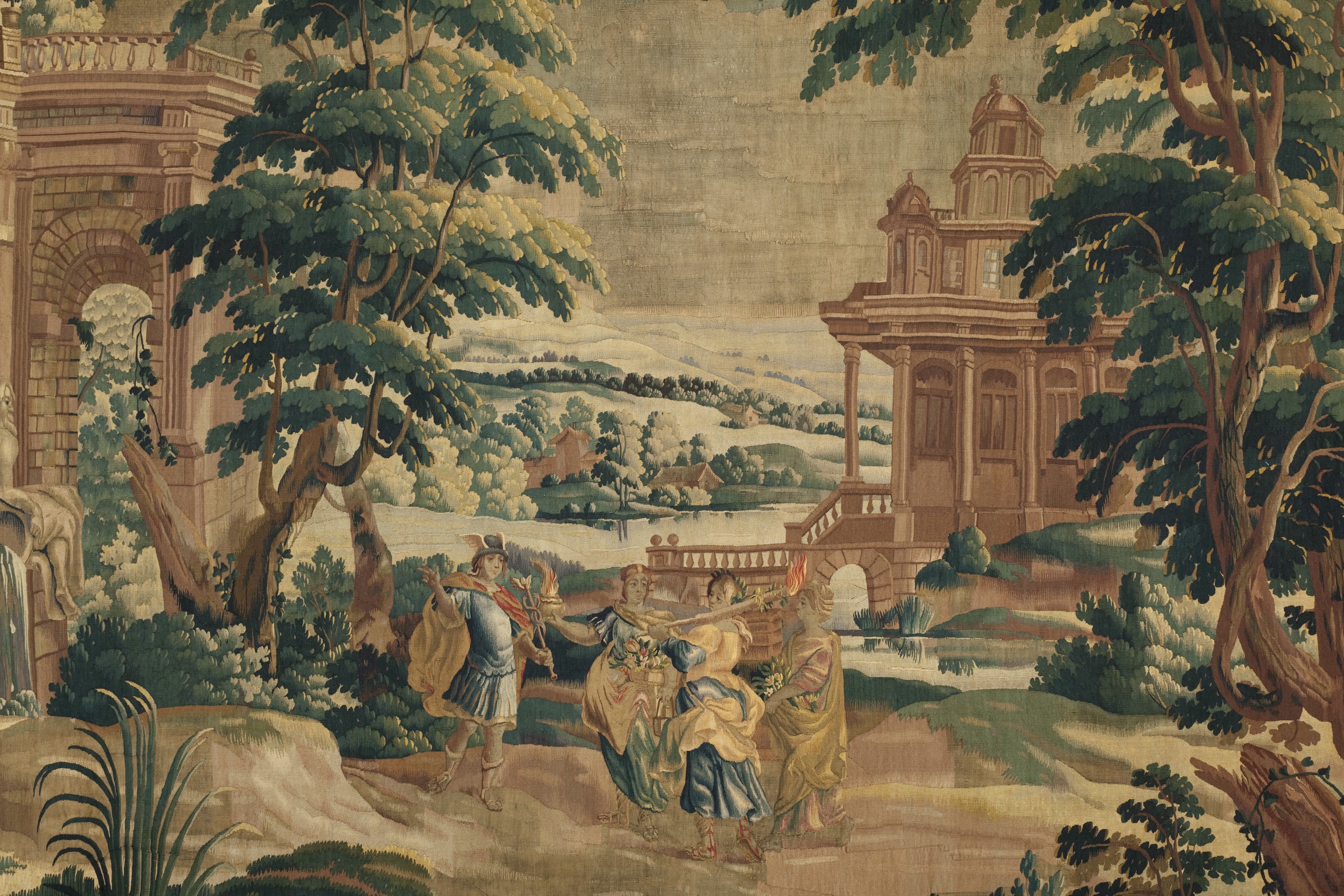
Mercury, Herse and Aglaurus

The earliest writer to mention her is Euripides in his play Ion, lines 22–23 and 484–485. In Moses Hadas and John Mclean's 1960 Bantam Classics translation they have Euripides say:

"(Athena) gave Erichthonius to Aglaurus' daughters to keep"

Later, speaking of "a haunt of Pan":

"There the daughters of Aglaurus still tread the measures of their dance, on the green lawns before the shrine of Pallas (Athena)"

In another version of the story, as told by the Bibliotheca, Hephaestus attempted to rape Athena but was unsuccessful. His semen fell on the ground, impregnating Gaia. Gaia did not want the infant Erichthonius, so she gave the baby to the goddess Athena. Athena gave the baby in a box to three women — Aglaurus and her two sisters — and warned them to never open it. Nonetheless, Aglaurus and Herse opened the box. The sight of the infant caused them both to go insane and they threw themselves off the Acropolis, or, in the Fabulae, into the sea.

An alternative version of the same story is that, while Athena was away bringing a limestone mountain from the Pallene peninsula to use in the Acropolis, the sisters, minus Pandrosus again, opened the box. A crow witnessed the opening and flew away to tell Athena, who fell into a rage and dropped the mountain (now Mount Lycabettus). Once again, Herse and Aglaurus went insane and threw themselves to their deaths from a cliff.

Another legend represents Aglaurus in a totally different light. Athens was at one time involved in a long and protracted war, and an oracle declared that the war would cease if someone would sacrifice himself for the good of his country. Agraulos (as she is spelled in this version) came forward and threw herself off the Acropolis. The Athenians, in gratitude for this, built her a temple on the Acropolis, in which it subsequently became customary for the young Athenians, on receiving their first suit of armor, to take an oath that they would always defend their country to the last.

According to Ovid, Mercury loved Herse but her jealous sister, whom Ovid calls Aglauros, stood between them, barring Mercury's entry into the house and refusing to move. Mercury was outraged at her presumption and turned her to stone. It is in reference to this myth that Dante places her on the second terrace of Purgatory, alongside Cain, to serve as God's reins against envy.

== Worship ==
One of the Attic demes (Agraule) derived its name from this heroine, and a festival and mysteries were celebrated at Athens in honor of her. According to Porphyry, she was also worshiped in Cyprus, where human sacrifices were offered to her down to a very late time. Mythographers believe Aglaurus to have an origin distinct from that of her sisters, due in part to the fact that she had her own sanctuary near the Acropolis, and unlike her sister Pandrosus, was more associated with young men or soldiers (epheboi) than with infants. She was particularly associated with the festival of Athena called the Plynteria.

The Agraulia (ἀγραυλία) was a festival celebrated by the Athenians in honour of Agraulos.

== Gallery ==
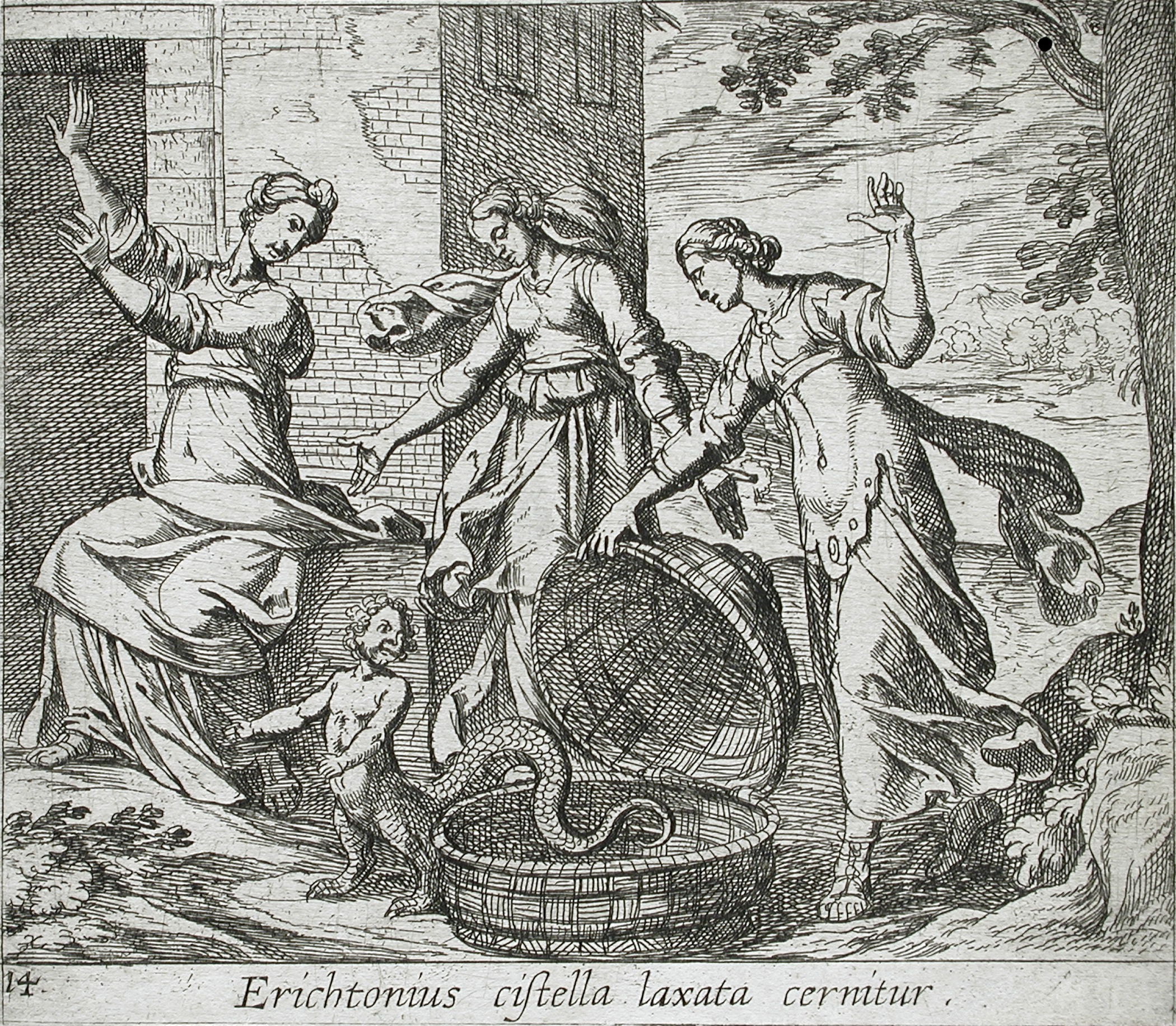
Erichthonius Released from His Basket by Antonio Tempesta (1606)

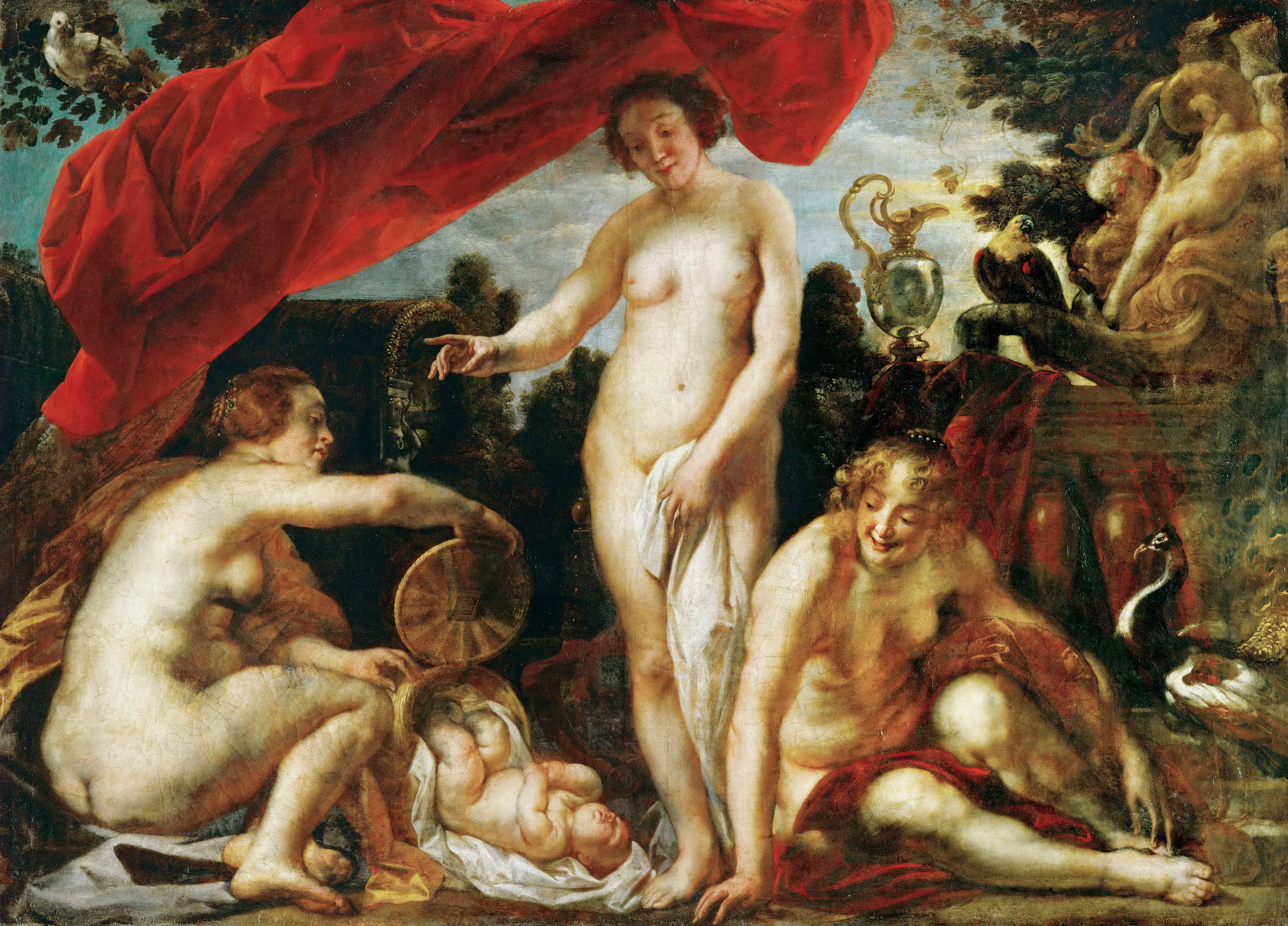
Daughters of Kekrops Finding Erichthonios by Jacob Jordaens (1640)

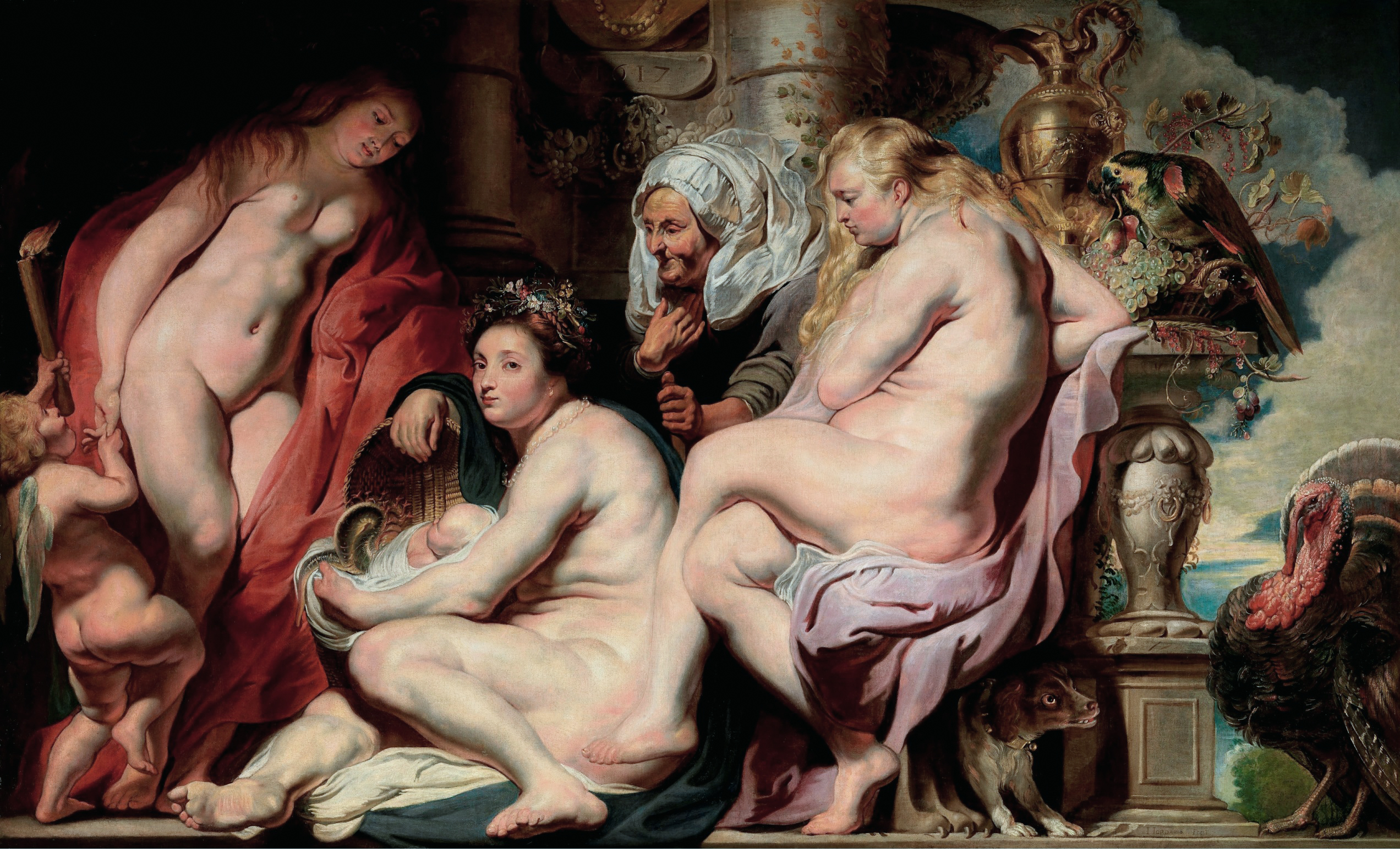
Les Filles de Cécrops découvrant l'enfant Érichthonios by Jacob Jordaens (1617)

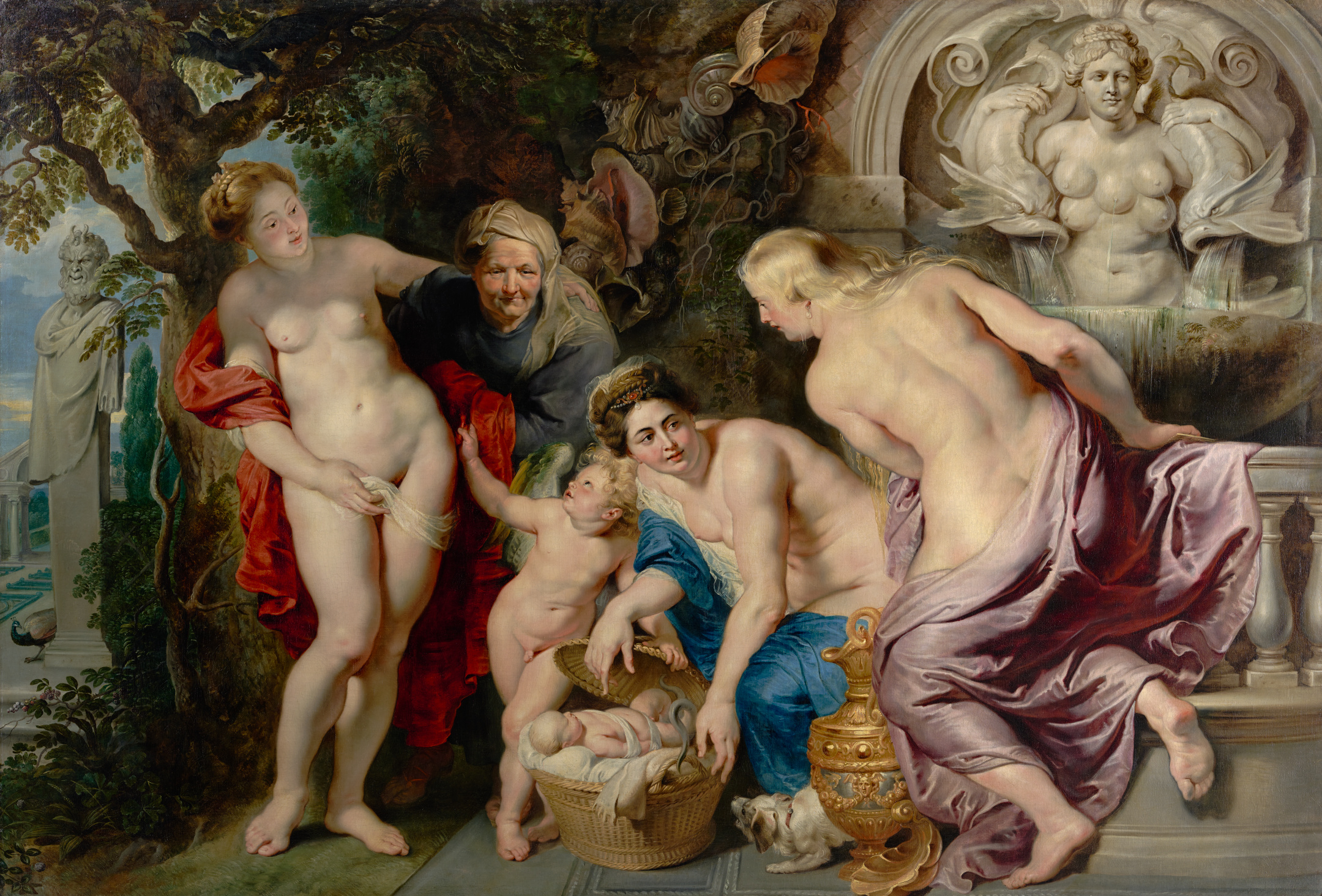
The Discovery of the Child Erichthonius by Peter Paul Rubens (circa 1615)

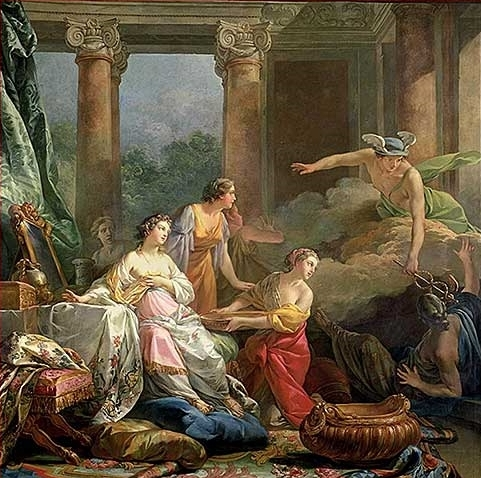
Mercury, Herse and Aglauros by Jean-Baptiste Marie Pierre (1763)

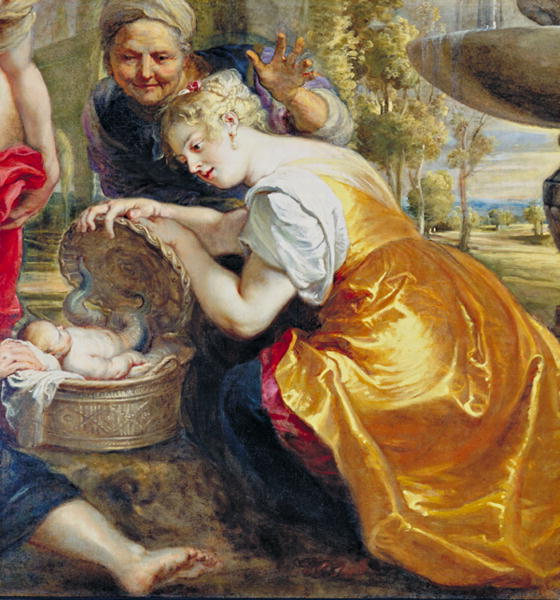
Finding of Erichthonius by Peter Paul Rubens (between 1632 and 1633)

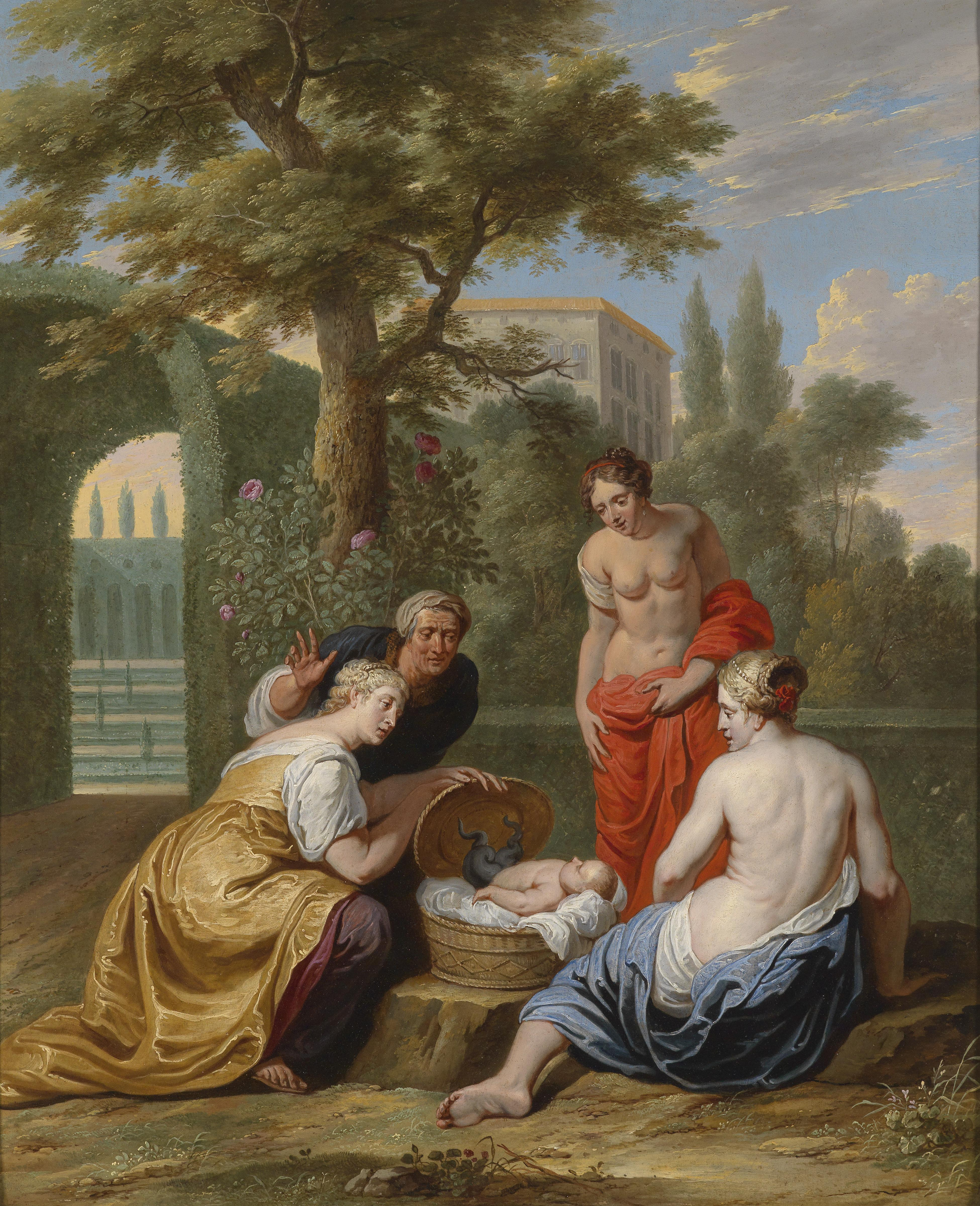
The finding of the infant Erichthonius by Cecrops's daughters by Willem van Herp (circa 1650))

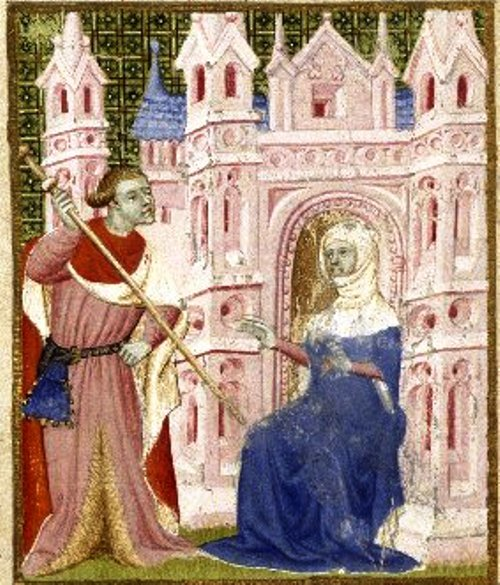
Aglauros refuses Mercury admittance to her sister Herse (15 century)

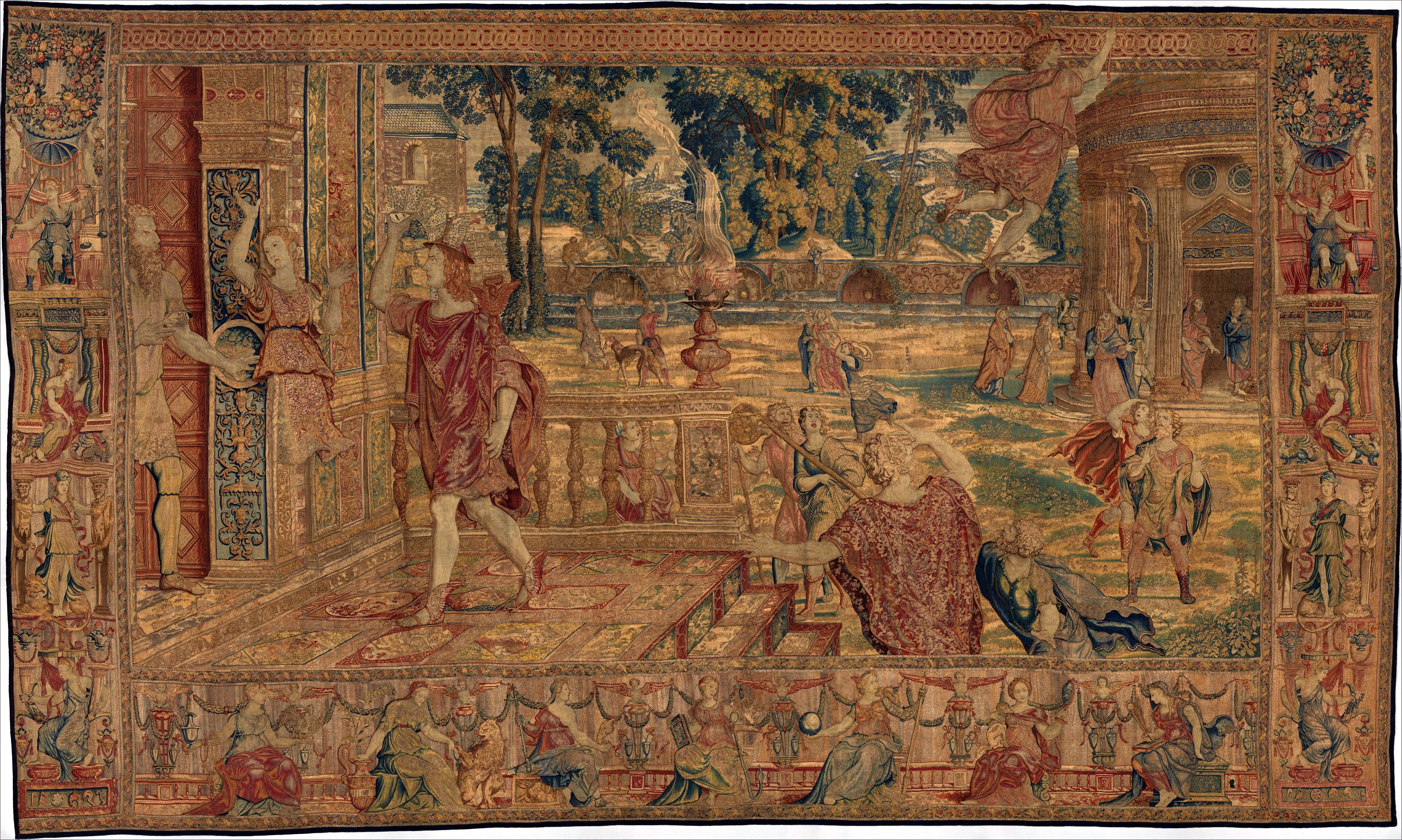
Aglauros Changed to Stone by Mercury by Giovanni Battista Lodi da Cremona (circa 1550)
