= Pandrosus =

Daughter of Cecrops I in Greek mythology

- Princess of Athens
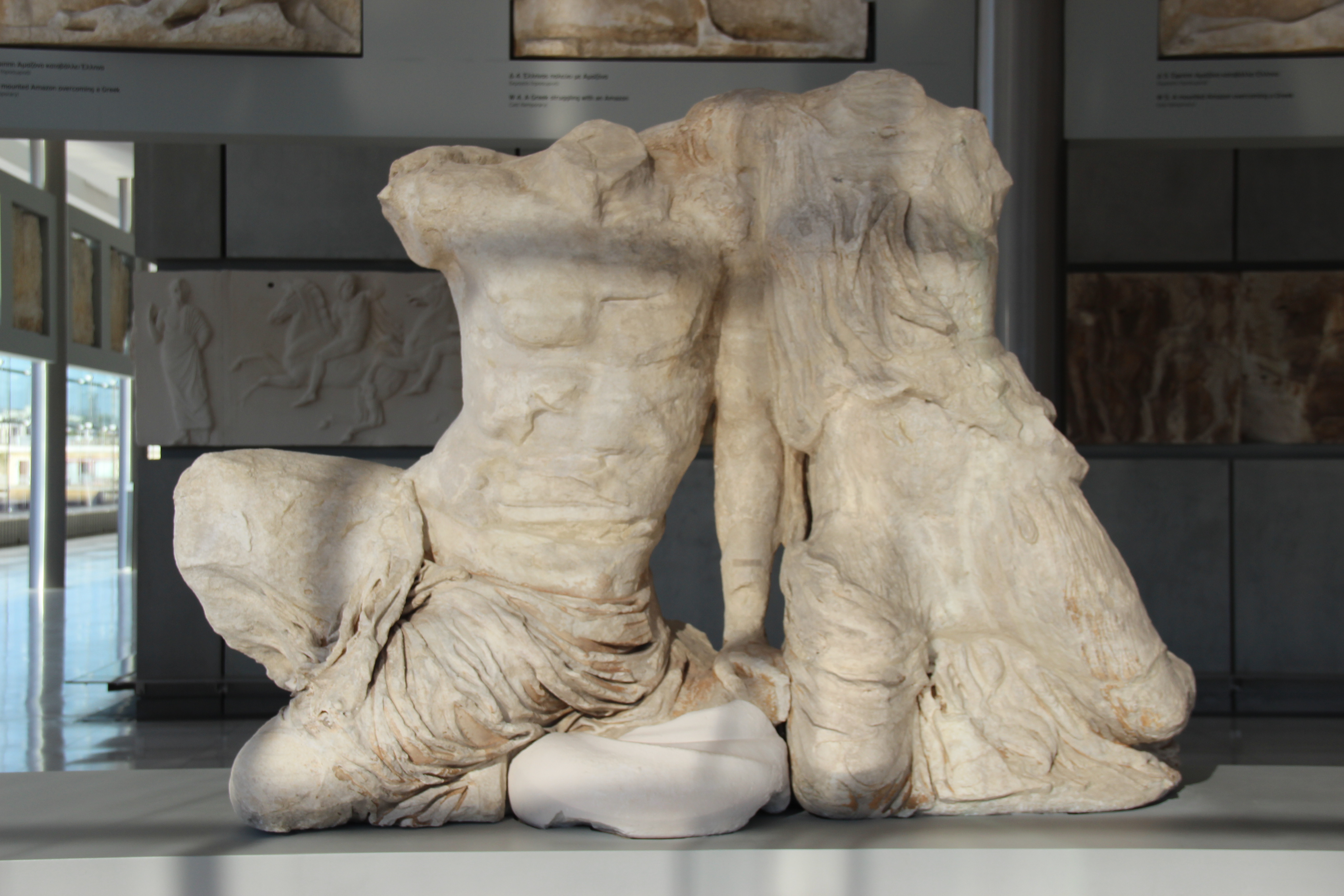
- Pandrosus with her father Cecrops on the east pediment of the Parthenon, Acropolis Museum.
- Abode: Athens

Genealogy
- Parents: Cecrops I and Aglaurus
- Siblings: Aglaurus, Herse, and Erysichthon
- Consort: Hermes
- Offspring: Ceryx

Pandrosos or Pandrosus (Ancient Greek: Πάνδροσος, romanized: Pándrosos, lit. 'all-bedewing', 'all-dewy', or 'refreshing') was known in Greek myth as one of the three daughters of Cecrops I, the first king of Athens, and Aglaurus, daughter of King Actaeus.

== Family ==
Pandrosus' two sisters were Aglauros and Herse, and the three of them together are often referred to collectively as the Kekropidai after their father. Their brother was called Erysichthon who died without producing an heir to the throne. In one account, Pandrosus was by Hermes the mother of Ceryx rather than her sister Agraulus.

== Etymology ==
The name "Pandrosos" carries the meaning of "all dew" or "all bedewed" in the Greek language (drosos, dew). For this reason, Pandrosos is at times called the "Dew Goddess" and the three Kekropidai together are sometimes referred to as the "Dew Sisters."

The name "Herse" also holds connotations of dew in the Greek. This has led to speculation among scholars that originally there were only two Kekropidai and that Herse was a later addition to the myth, functioning essentially as a double of Pandrosos. The purpose of the creation of the character of Herse would have been to bring the number of Kekropidai up to three so as to conform to the common trope of three sisters in Greek mythology (in keeping with the Three Fates, the Three Charites, etc.).

== Mythology ==
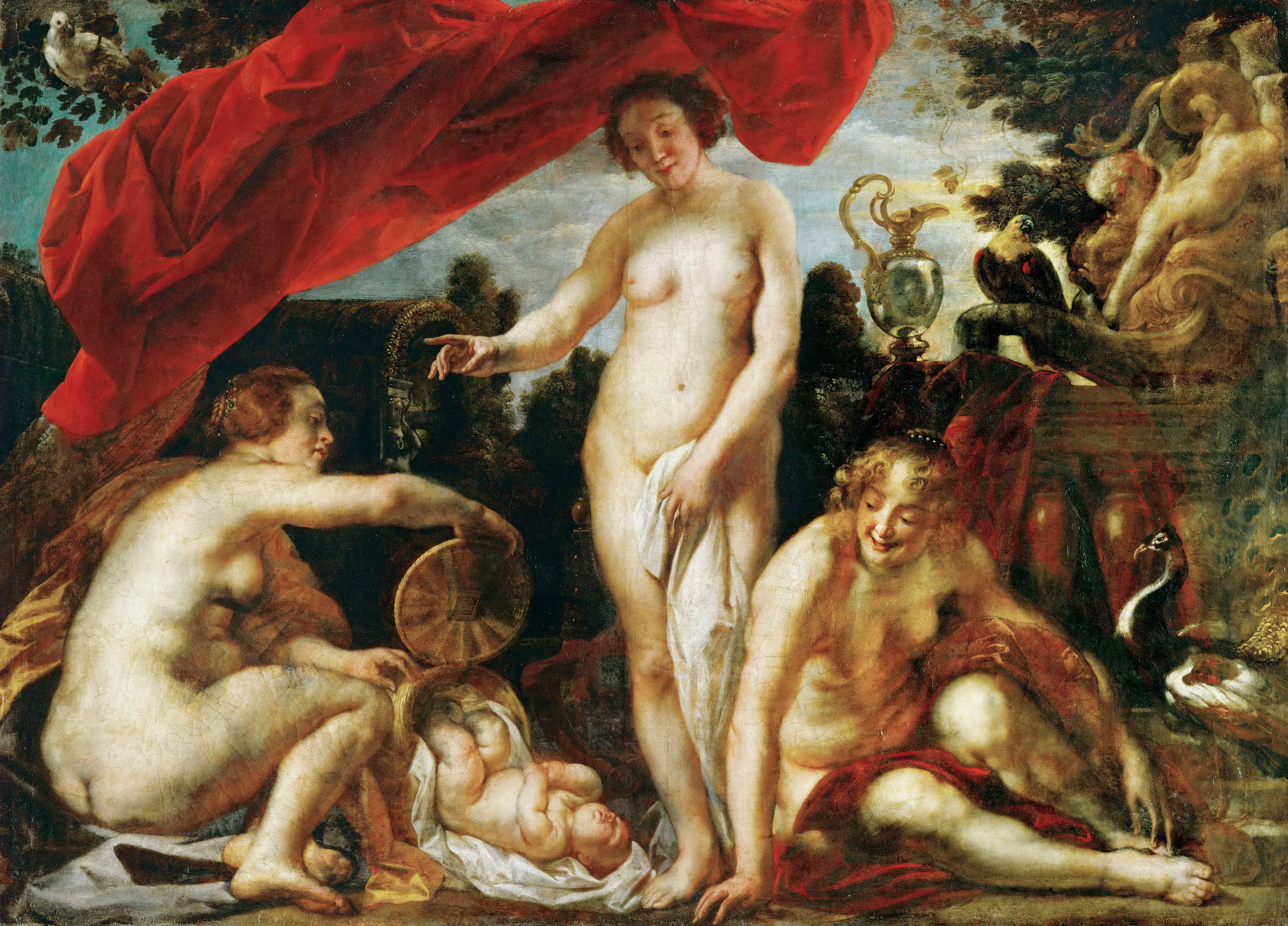
Daughters of Kekrops Finding Erichthonios by Jacob Jordaens (1640)

Kekrops is thought to have been born from the soil of Athens itself, and possesses the head and torso of a man and the lower body of a snake. Beyond his status as Athens’ first king, he is known for judging the contest between Poseidon and Athena that decided the naming and patronage of the city. However, following his death, Kekrops is not succeeded by his son, but rather by Erechtheus (also known by the name Erichthonios), the child of Hephaestus and Gaia.

As told by the Bibliotheca, the god Hephaestus, in a fit of passion, attempts to rape the virgin goddess Athena, but is unsuccessful. In vain pursuit, he ejaculates on the Acropolis, and his seed fertilizes the soil there, impregnating Gaia and leading to the birth of Erechtheus. After Erechtheus is born, Athena takes the baby into her care and places him into a chest (or, in some versions of the story, a basket). She entrusts the chest to the Kekropidai, warning them never to look inside.

While Pandrosos faithfully follows Athena's instructions, Aglauros and Herse are compelled by curiosity to open the chest, provoking Athena's wrath. The two disobedient sisters are driven mad when they see the contents of the chest (in some versions of the myth, they see Erechtheus being guarded by a giant snake; in others, they see Erechtheus himself in the form of a snake), and hurl themselves off of the northern slope of the Acropolis, falling to their deaths. As the dutiful sister, Pandrosos is spared her sisters’ unfortunate fates.

There are several other versions of the myth of the Kekropidai. They generally disagree with one another on the topic of which of the sisters carries the blame for opening the chest. In one version, all three sisters are equally culpable, and Pandrosos succumbs to the temptation to look inside the chest along with her sisters. Another version of the myth holds Aglauros and Pandrosos as blameworthy, with Herse taking on the role of Pandrosos as the innocent sister. Yet another version tells the tale that Aglauros alone opened the chest, and that Pandrosos and Herse were spared Athena's wrath for dutifully following the goddess’ instructions.

== Cult and worship ==
=== Arrephoria ===
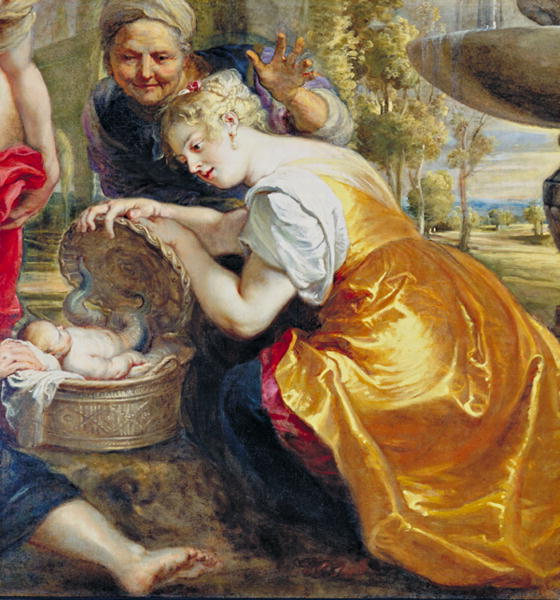
Finding of Erichthonius by Peter Paul Rubens (between 1632 and 1633).

The Arrephoria was a night festival that took place during the Greek month of Skiraphorion at the height of summer in the honor of Athena and Aphrodite. The myth of the Kekropidai was inherently connected to the festival and could be taken as a mythic paradigm for a yearly ritual that was carried out by the Arrephoroi during this time. The Arrephoroi consisted of two young girls selected from Athens' aristocratic families by the Archon Basileus (king archon/magistrate). After being selected, these girls would live in a home on the Acropolis for the duration of a year in order to serve Athena; the end of their period of service would culminate in the Arrephoria where they would perform the initiation ritual that would signify their passage into the next stage of their lives.

According to a description given by Pausanias, the Greek geographer:

For a certain time the Arrephoroi have their living from the Goddess: and when the festival comes round they have to perform certain ceremonies during the night. They carry on their heads what Athena’s priestess gives them to carry, and neither she who gives it nor they who carry it know what it is she gives them. In the city not far from Aphrodite-in-the-Gardens is an enclosed place with a natural entrance to an underground descent; this is where the virgin girls go down. They leave down there what they were carrying, and take another thing and bring it back covered up. They are then sent away, and other virgin girls are brought to the Acropolis instead of them.

In this context, the myth of the Kekropidai served as a warning for the consequences of disobedience to the Arrephoroi who were forbidden to look into the chests that they were given to carry on their heads. Pandrosos, as the obedient daughter who obeyed Athena's commands, served as a role model for the Arrephoroi who were expected to follow her example when carrying the ritual objects to the sanctuary of Aphrodite. It has been suggested in scholarship that Pandrosos’ obedience was acknowledged in the form of sacrifices; according to an old Attic law, whenever the sacrifice of a cow was made to Athena, it was necessary to sacrifice a ewe to Pandrosos as well, even outside of the time of the Arrephoria.

The two disobedient daughters, Aglauros and Herse, were also acknowledged during the Arrephoria. It is generally accepted that the Arrephoroi themselves represented the two unfaithful Kekropidai. The nighttime descent of the Arrephoroi could be taken as a symbolic reenactment of the scene in which Aglauros and Herse fling themselves from the Acropolis after viewing the contents of the chest that Athena gave to them.

=== Pandroseion ===
The Pandroseion was a sanctuary dedicated to Pandrosos located on the north side of the Acropolis, just to the west of the Erechtheion, a sanctuary dedicated to Erechtheus. It was an open-air precinct built in the shape of a quadrilateral, and its principal feature was Athena's sacred olive tree. In the shade of the olive tree stood an altar to Zeus Herkeios (Zeus of the Court). The southeast corner A door in the lower storey of the western wall of the Erechtheion provided direct access between the Pandroseion and the Erechtheion's interior; yet another doorway also connected the Pandroseion to the north porch of the Erechtheion. In this manner, the Pandroseion could be considered an appendage of the larger Erechtheion—perhaps fittingly considering the manner in which the myth surrounding Pandrosos intertwines with the tale of the birth of Erechtheus.

== Gallery ==
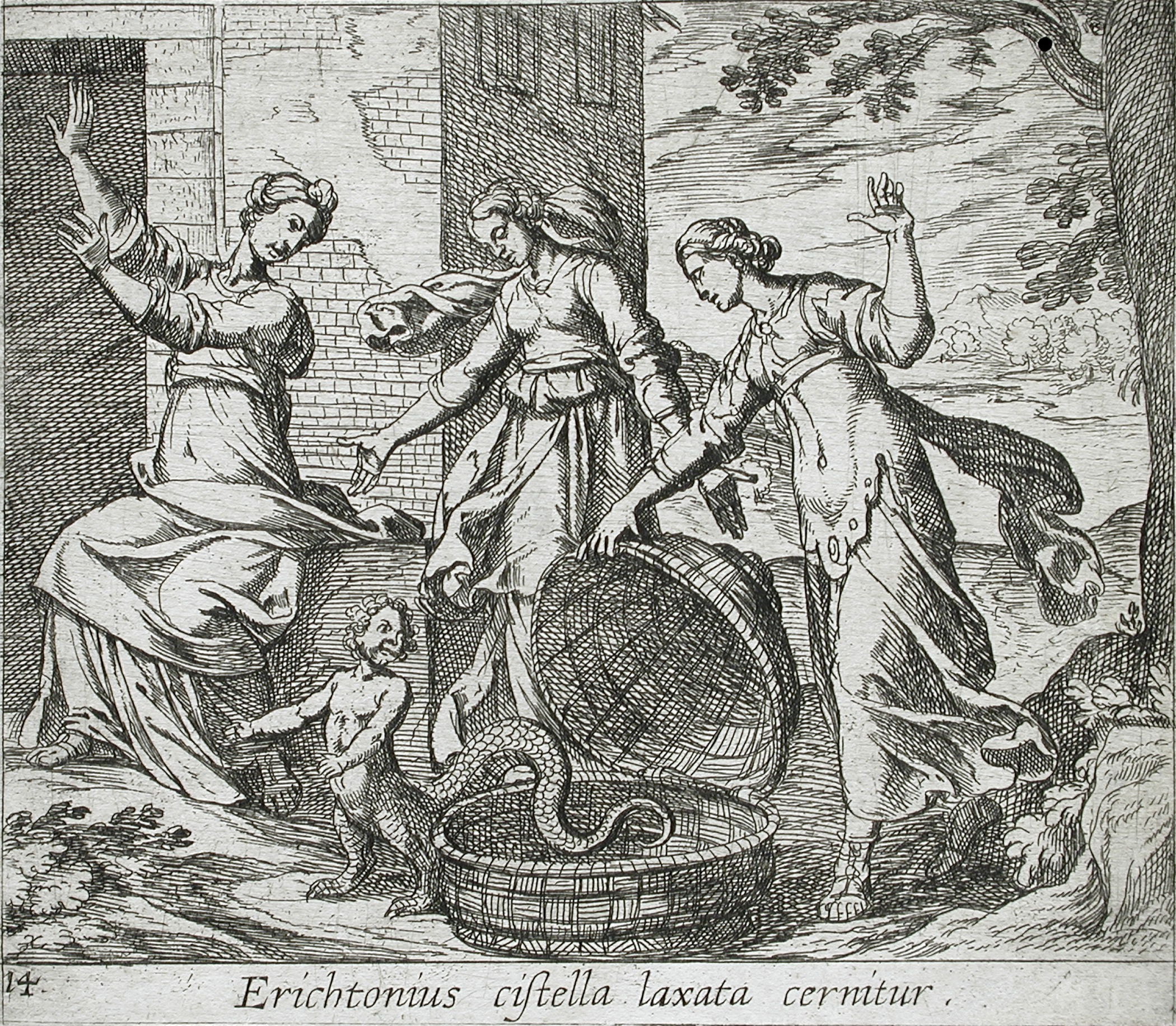
Erichthonius Released from His Basket by Antonio Tempesta (1606)

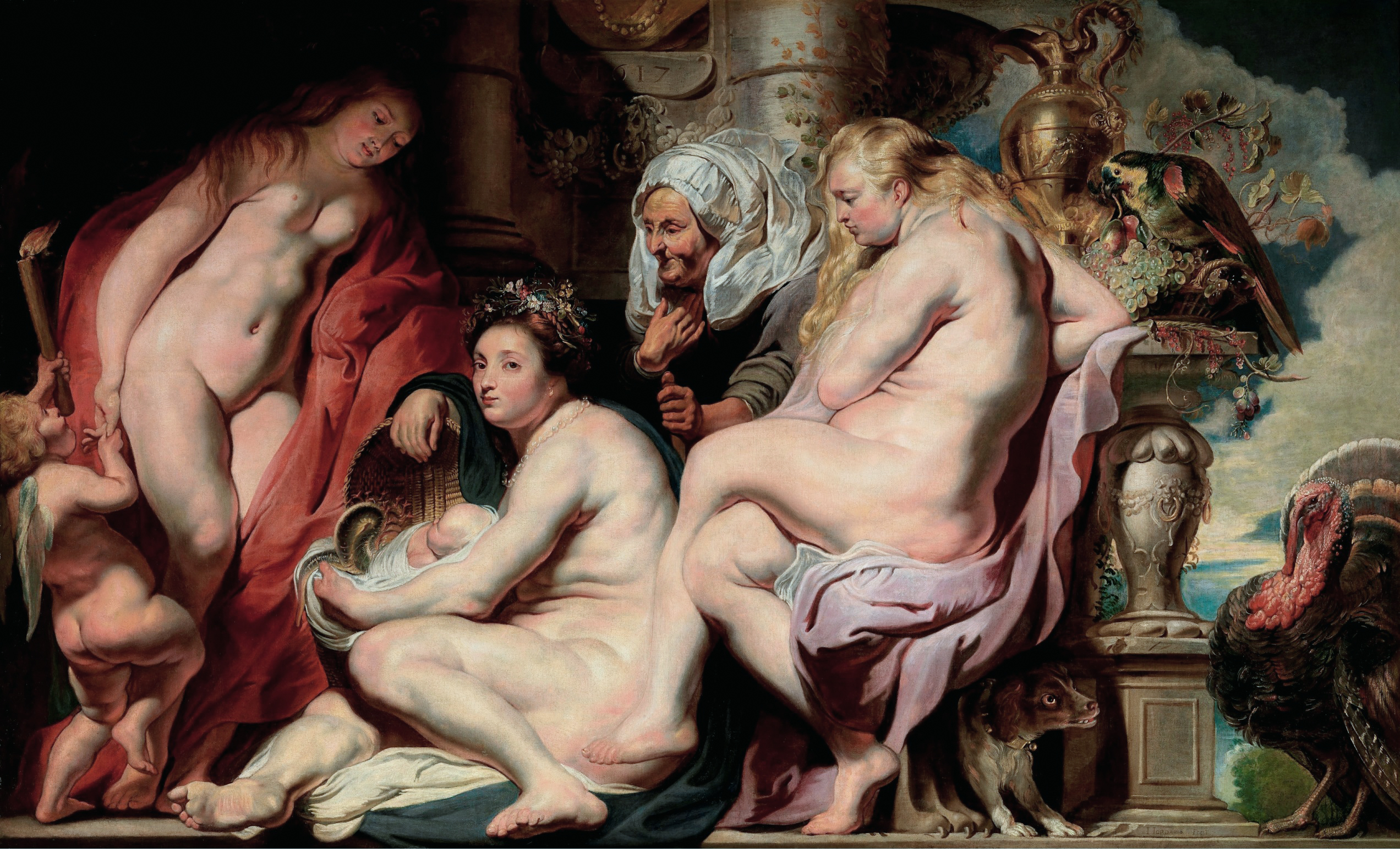
Les Filles de Cécrops découvrant l'enfant Érichthonios by Jacob Jordaens (1617)

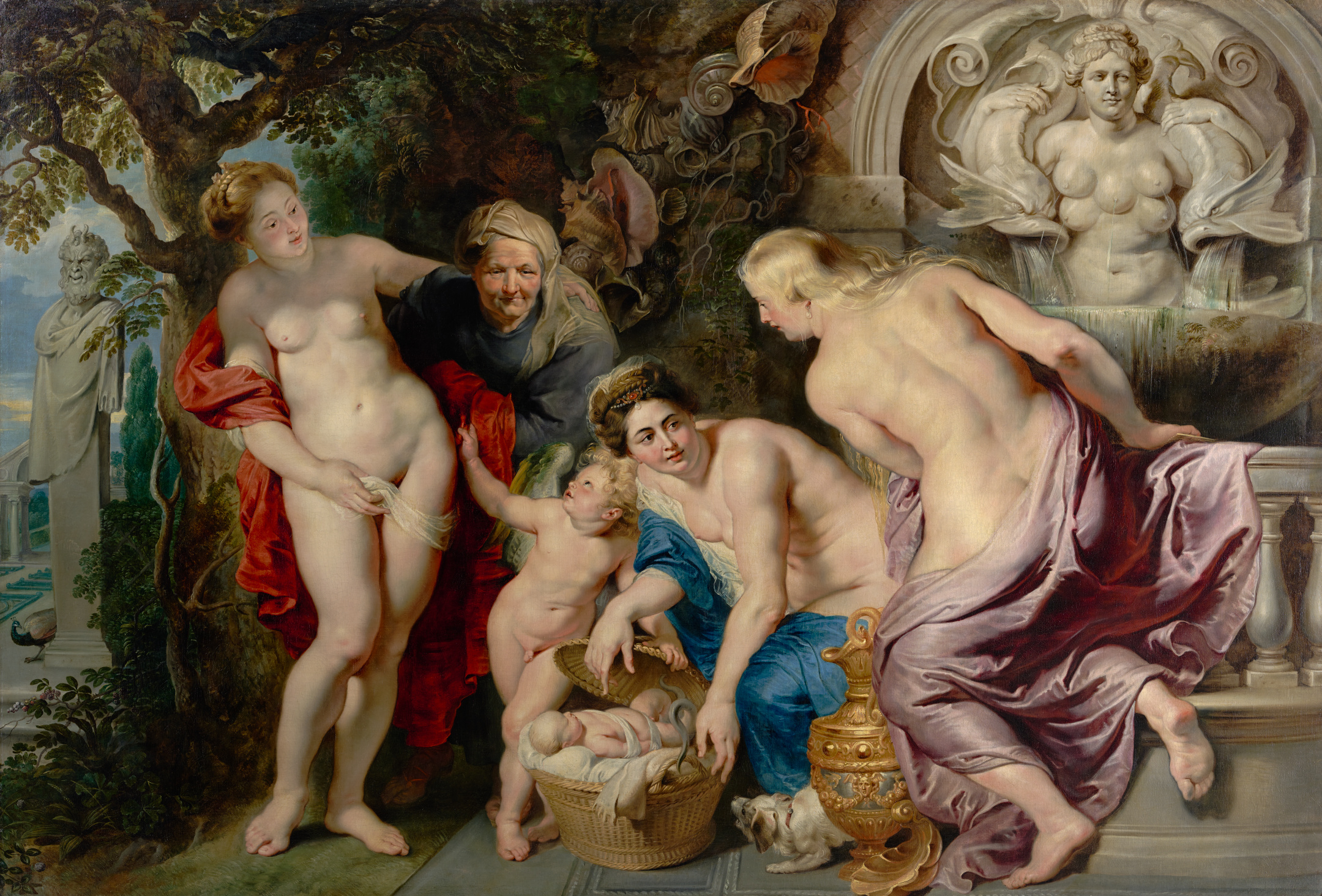
The Discovery of the Child Erichthonius by Peter Paul Rubens (circa 1615)

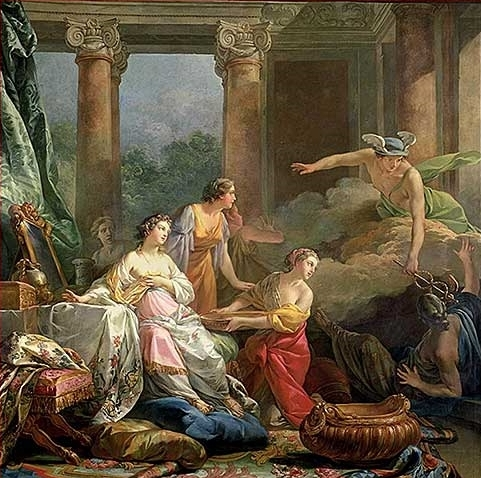
Mercury, Herse and Aglauros by Jean-Baptiste Marie Pierre (1763)

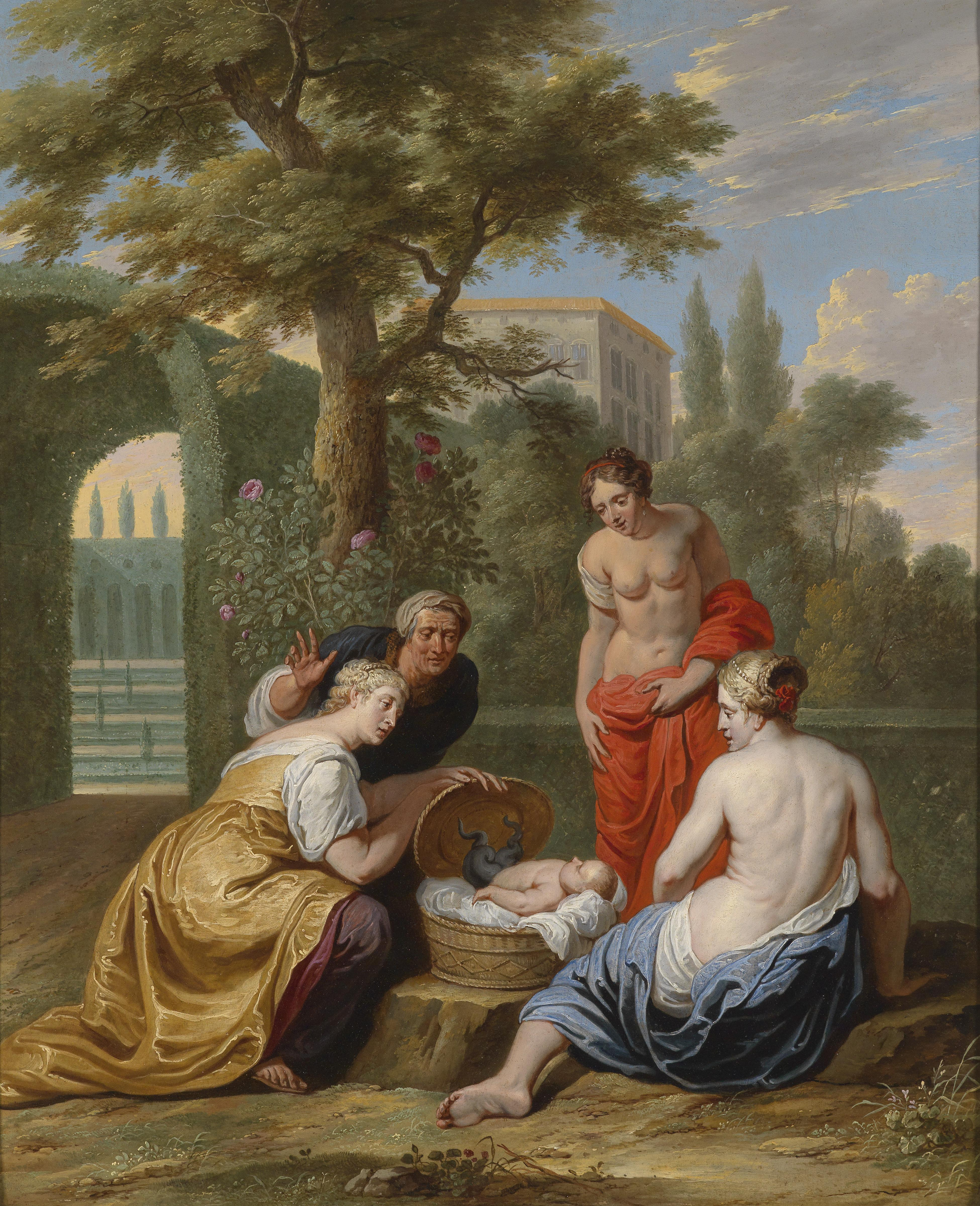
The finding of the infant Erichthonius by Cecrops's daughters by Willem van Herp (circa 1650))
