= Arrhephoria =

Religious festival in ancient Greece

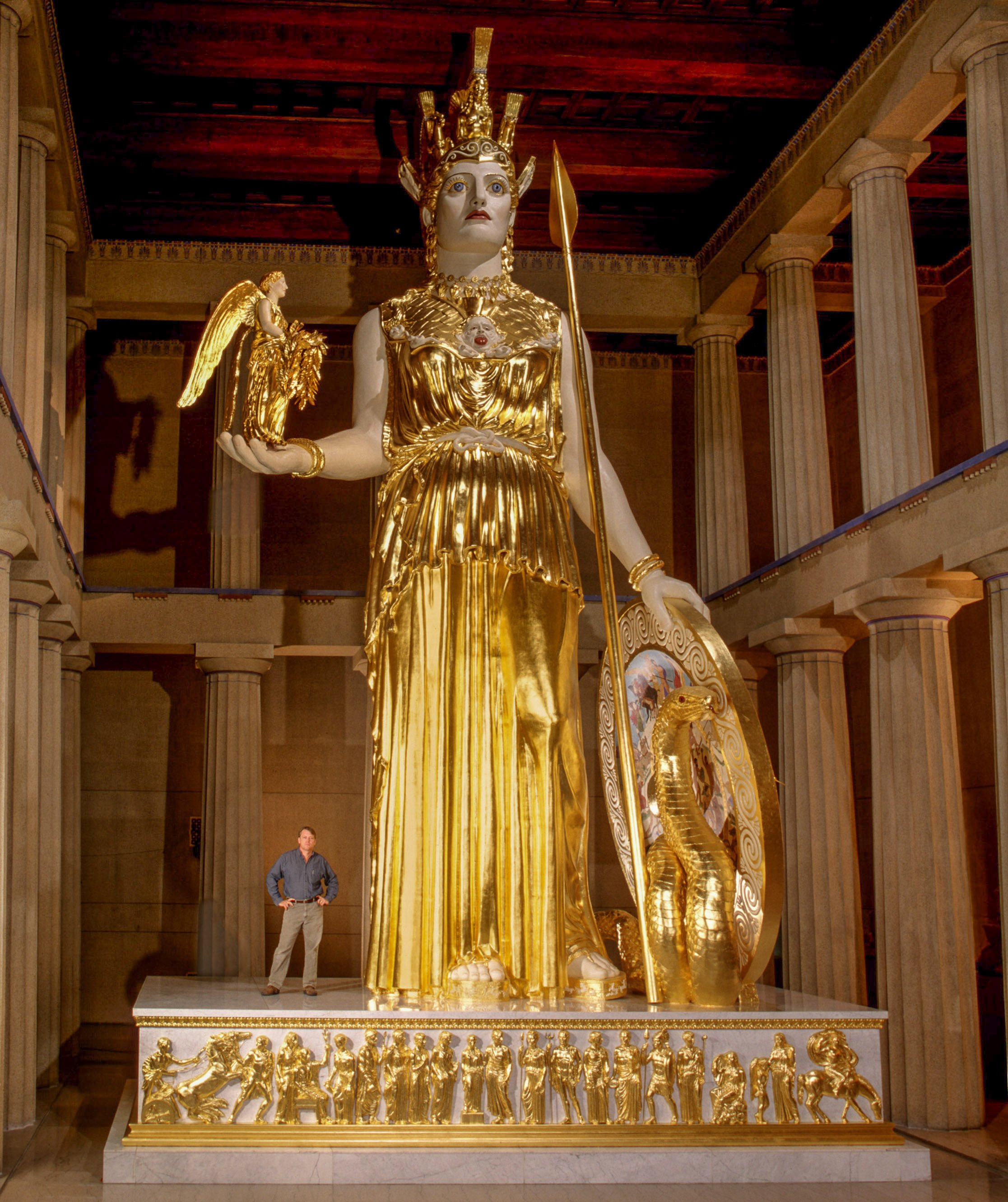
A recreation of the Statue of Athena that would have been found inside the Parthenon.

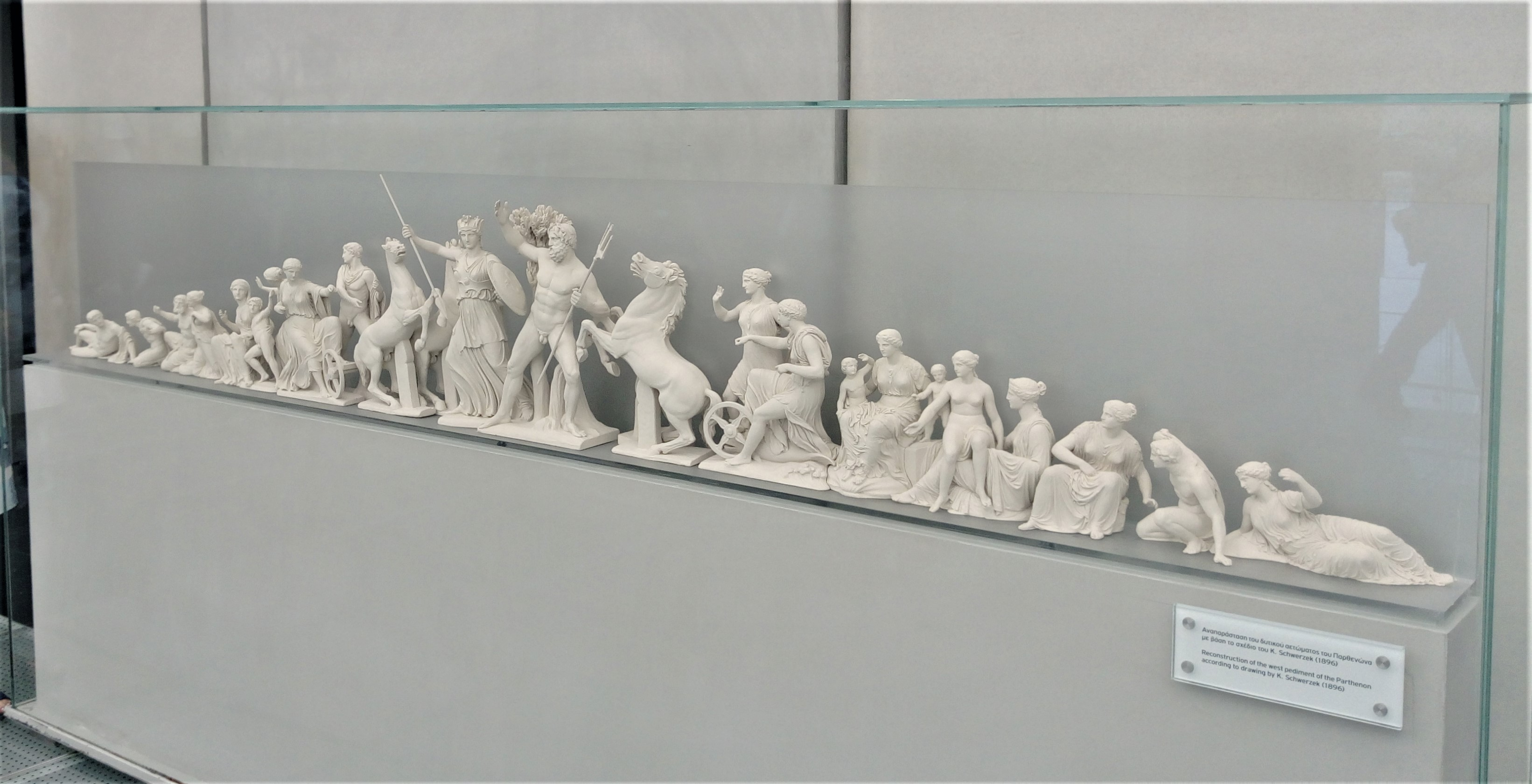
Recreation of the west pediment of the Parthenon.

Arrhephoria was a feast among the Athenians, instituted in honor of Athena. The word is derived from the Greek term Ἀρρηφόρια ("Arrhēphória"), which is composed of ἄρρητος ("árrhētos," "unspoken, not to be divulged") and φέρω ("phérō," to carry"). This feast was also called Hersiphoria, from Herse, the daughter of Cecrops, on whose account it was established.

== Historical celebration ==
On the Athenian Acropolis two girls aged between seven and eleven were elected to live for a year at a time as arrhephoroi, tending the sacred olive tree and weaving, with the help of other women, the new robe for Athena. Proud parents commemorated their daughters' service by making dedications on the Acropolis. At the annual festival of the Arrhephoria the girls (according to Pausanias) placed on their heads what the priestess of Athena gives them to carry. Neither the priestess nor the girls know what it is she is giving them. In the city there is a sacred precinct not far from that of Aphrodite in the Garden and through it runs a natural underground passage. Here the virgins descend. Down below they leave behind what they have brought and take something else and carry it, veiled as it is. These two virgins are discharged forthwith and others are taken up to the Acropolis in their place.

Interpretation of the festival is difficult because of the lack of sources, but it is clear that the virginal arrhephoroi are chosen from the noblest families of the city and are deployed in a context of impregnation (dew), sexual power (Aphrodite and Eros), and birth (Erichthonios). The word "arrhephoros" etymologically probably means "dew carrier", which at first sight does not help. The arrhephoroi were charged with weaving the peplos (garments) for Athena. The aletrides ground the grain for Athena. The arktoi were the priestesses who celebrated a rite intended to forgive an offense against Artemis. The kanephoroi were the girls who carried the baskets with all of the offerings to the festival. Kanephoros were common place in rituals or feasts similar to Arrhephoria as it was a held position of honor in Ancient Athens. Archaeological evidence reveals that from near the Erechtheion a secret stairway led off the Acropolis past a small rock-cut shrine of Eros and Aphrodite, near which was the precinct to which they were going. The mythical associations of the arrhephoroi are with their starting-point the Erechtheion.

In the fifth century B.C. Aristophanes, in his comic play Lysistrata detailed the stages for the women during this festival:

For at seven years or less I became a girl priestess in the Erechthean temple of the Maid; And at ten upon this hill I made flour in the mill. For the cakes which to our Lady are displayed, Then I went to Brauron town and put on a yellow gown. To walk in the procession as the Bear; To complete my perfect score I the sacred basket bore at Athena's feast when I was young and fair. (1.1.663-673)

These stages have certain tasks which display the ancient system that all girls must go by when reaching puberty. The stages of this "initiation" are as follows. The Arrhephoroi comes first, and is a time when the girl dresses in white and begins to weave for the offering to Athena. This is an art that was always performed by women at that time, and therefore had to be taught at a young age. The second stage is to teach the girl how to bake, specifically, how to bake bread. The third step is considered a symbol of death and resurrection. The girl must attend and participate in the festival with the older women. These stages are all tasks that the girl will use for the rest of her life, and therefore are held in high importance and expectation.

It is believed through sources that Attica was one of the first in history to have one of these festivals.

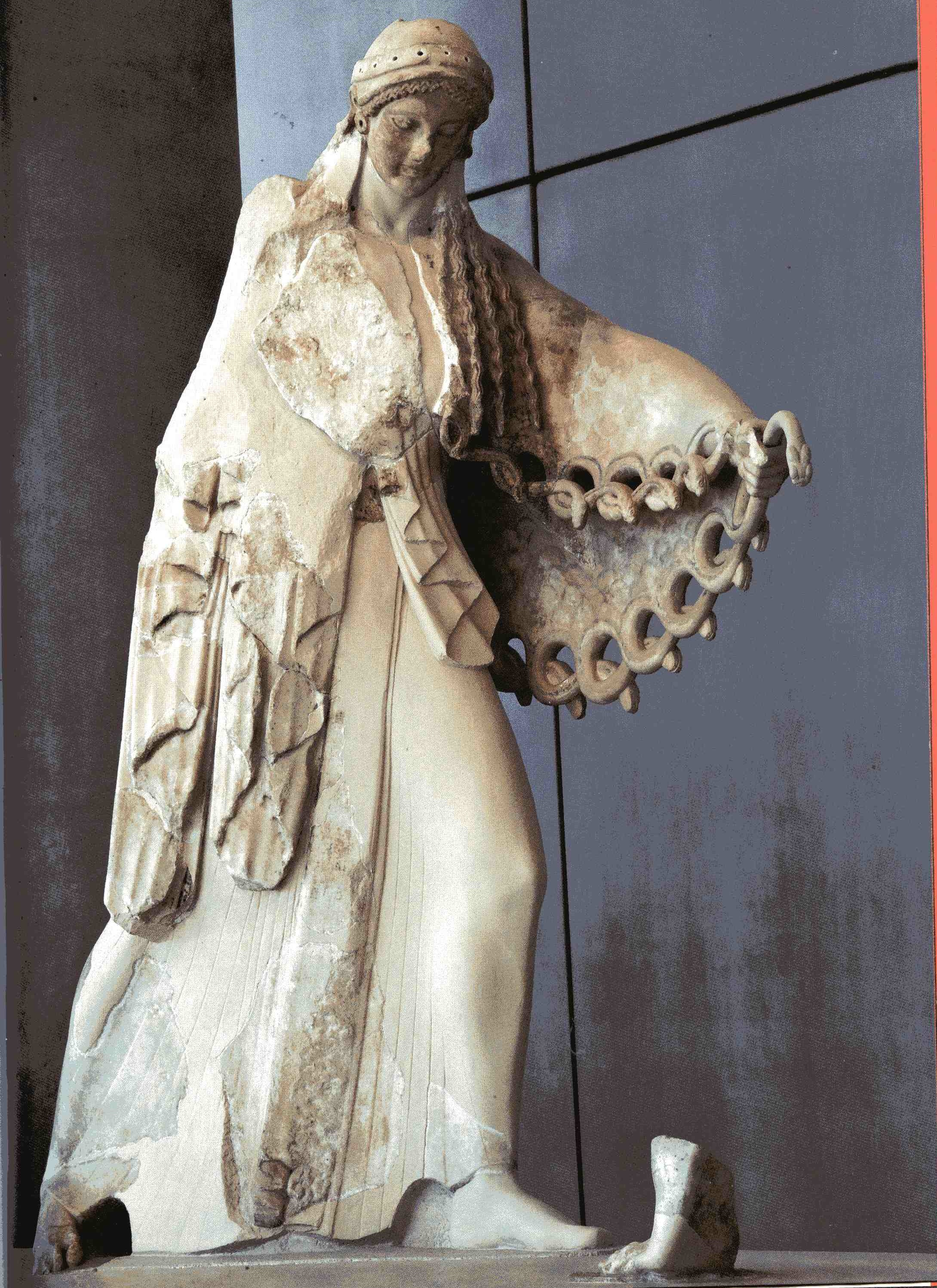
A stone statue of the goddess Athena found in the west side of the Acropolis.

== Mythos connection ==
The ritual itself is based on a mythological story of Athena and her punishment of two young girls. Kekrops, the first king of Athens, whose tomb was in the complex, had three daughters, Aglauros, Herse, and Pandrosos. The mystery revolves around innocence, obedience, and fecundity. They were given a closed basket by Athena who forbade them to open it. One night Aglauros and Herse gave in to curiosity, opened the basket, and saw Ericthonios, the mysterious child of Hephaestus. Athena punishing the girls for breaking her trust made snakes appear out of the basket, and in terror the two girls jumped off the Acropolis to their deaths. The sanctuary of Aglauros lies at the foot of the cliff; it may have been the precinct to which the arrhephoroi descended. Pandrosos, who did not succumb to this fatal curiosity, has a shrine next to the sacred olive tree on the Acropolis itself. The connection was to celebrate Pandrosos and to have two girls fulfill the duty of the two who had failed Athena. In connection to the myth the arrhephoroi and the priestesses did not even know what the secret items were as to carry out a very similar burden.

== Modern day celebration ==
Some modern followers of Hellenism choose to celebrate it on the 3rd of Skirophorion, but there is no historical evidence of it being on this exact day. Some who practice Arrhephoria as in the modern day view it as a time to clear room for new things and complete projects in their personal lives.

== Connected rituals ==
Kallynteria and Plynteria were two rituals that were connected to Arrhephoria in the way that they were both rituals prepared for Arrhephoria. Kallynteria was where Athenians cleans the shrine of Athena and making sure the eternal flame of Athena is re-lighted. While the Plynteria involved taking the robes and jewelry from the cult statue of Athena where they would cleanse all removed from the statue and taken to the coast. They would rinse the items from the statue in salt water and then return them back to the statue after they were cleansed.

== See also ==
- Athenian festivals
