= Aglaurus =

Several figures in Greek mythology

Aglaurus (/əˈɡlɔːrəs/; Ancient Greek: Ἄγλαυρος, lit. 'dewfall' or 'shining dew') or Agraulus (/əˈɡrɔːləs/; Ἄγραυλος, lit. 'living in the fields' or the 'rustic one') is a name attributed to three figures in Greek mythology.

- Aglaurus, the daughter of Actaeus, the first king of Attica. She married Cecrops and according to Apollodorus became the mother of Erysichthon, Agraulus, Herse, and Pandrosus; other authors, however, including Pausanias and Hyginus, state that the eldest daughter of the couple is "Aglaurus" (see next entry), not "Agraulus".
- Aglaurus, the daughter of Cecrops and the above Aglaurus, who was driven to suicide for ignoring a warning from the goddess Athena.
- In the Fabulae, attributed to Hyginus, Aglaurus is the child resulting from an incestuous relationship between Erectheus and his daughter Procris. This genealogy is otherwise unknown.
