= Ceryx =

Priest of Demeter at Eleusis

In Greek mythology, Ceryx (/ˈsɪərɪks/, /ˈsiːrɪks/; Ancient Greek: Κῆρυξ, romanized: Kērux, lit. 'herald') was a member of the Athenian royal family as the son of Hermes by either of the princesses Pandrosus or Agraulus.

== Mythology ==
Ceryx was, like his father, a messenger. But the kêryx career began as a humble cook for the tribe, a skill Hermes demonstrates in his cooked meat offerings on the Twelve Gods Altar set in place in 522 BC by Peisistratos III in Athens. The Homeric Hymn to Hermes 128 recalls the young god cutting out and laying up twelve steaks on a flat rock or platamoni, the 12 Gods altar.

According to Pausanias, Ceryx was the youngest son of Eumolpus, one of the first priests of Demeter at Eleusis and a founder of the Eleusinian Mysteries. He founded the two families of high priests in Eleusis: the ceryces (or Ceryces), a family of priests in Athens, and the Eumolpidae.

== Ceryces ==
In Homer’s time, ceryx was a profession of trusted attendants or retainers of a chieftain. The role of ceryces /ˈsɛrɪˌsiːz/ expanded, however, to include acting as inviolable messengers between states, even in time of war, proclaiming meetings of the council, popular assembly, or court of law, reciting there the formulas of prayer, and summoning persons to attend. Hermes, himself the ceryx of the gods, was their patron and carried the caduceus (Latin corruption of Ancient Greek kerykeion), the herald’s staff.
