= Plynteria =

Festival in ancient Greece

Plynteria (Gr. πλυντήρια) was a festival of ancient Greece celebrated at Athens every year, on the 22nd of Thargelion, in honor of Athena Polias, with the heroine Aglauros (or with the two combined as Athena Aglauros), whose temple stood on the Acropolis. The festival's name came from plynein (πλύνειν), a Greek verb meaning "to wash".

Plutarch states that the festival took place on the 25th, but probably only because it lasted for several days. The day of this festival was at Athens among the apophrades (ἀποφράδες) or dies nefasti, that is, impure days on which temples were closed and business was not done. During the festival the temple of Athena was surrounded by a rope to preclude all communication with it. Her statue was stripped of its garments and ornaments so that they might be ritually cleaned, and was in the meanwhile covered over to conceal it from the sight of man. The genos of women who performed this service were called praxiergidai (πραξιεργίδαι). The city was therefore, so to speak, on this day without its protecting divinity, and any undertaking commenced on it was believed to be necessarily unsuccessful. A procession was also held on the day of the Plynteria, in which a quantity of dried figs, called hegetoria (ἡγητορία), was carried around.

The Plynteria is thought to have originated in Ionia, where some communities had a month named Plynterion.

== See also ==
- Athenian festivals
