= Erysichthon (son of Cecrops) =

In Greek mythology, Erysichthon (/ˌɛrɪˈsɪkθɒn/, Ancient Greek: Ἐρυσίχθων), also spelled Erisichthon (lit. 'Earth-tearer'), was an Athenian prince as the son of King Cecrops I of Athens and Agraulus, daughter of King Actaeus. His possible siblings were Aglaurus, Herse and Pandorus. Erysicthon died childless during his father's reign.

== Mythology ==
Erysichthon was said to have died in Prasiae (modern Porto Rafti), on the east coast of Attica, as he was returning from the holy island of Delos with a statue of Eileithuia, goddess of childbirth. Of the three ancient wooden images of the goddess that could be seen at her temple at Athens, one was identified as the image that Erysichthon had brought from Delos. According to Pausanias, Erysichthon's tomb could be seen at Prasiae, where his corpse was said to have been buried after his ship had arrived in port.
