= Menecrates of Olynthus =

Greek historian

Menecrates of Olynthus (Ancient Greek: Μενεκράτης) was a historian, probably from the 4th century BC. He is mentioned only once, in the Commentary on the Grammar of Dionysius.

Like his contemporary Andron of Ephesus, Menecrates claimed that the letters of the alphabet were named 'phoenicia' in honor of Phoenice, the fourth daughter of Actaeus, who died young and a virgin. This view appears to have been relatively widespread, as it was also supported by other authors, such as Scamon of Mytilene, a historian of the 4th century BC.
