= Tmolus =

Tmolus may refer to:

- Tmolus (mythology), several figures in Greek mythology.
- Mount Tmolus, Greek mountain range named for the mythical figure
- Tmolus (butterfly), a genus of butterflies in the family Lycaenidae
- Tmolus (town) or Aureliopolis in Lydia, a city in the Roman province of Lydia situated on Mount Tmolus

== See also ==
- Bozdağ, a town in Turkey formerly called Tmolos
