= Erichthonius Discovered by the Daughters of Cecrops =

Erichthonius Discovered by the Daughters of Cecrops may refer to:

- Erichthonius Discovered by the Daughters of Cecrops (Jordaens)
- Erichthonius Discovered by the Daughters of Cecrops (Rubens)
