= Polygonus =

Polygonus may refer to:

- Polygonus (butterfly), a genus of Nearctic and Neotropical spread-winged skippers
- Polygonus (mythology), the Thracian son of the sea god Proteus
