= Protaeus =

Scientific classification
- Kingdom: Animalia
- Phylum: Arthropoda
- Subphylum: Chelicerata
- Class: Arachnida
- Order: Araneae
- Infraorder: Araneomorphae
- Family: Salticidae
- Genus: Protaeus; Ni, Yu & Zhang, 2025

Type species
- P. nyarlathotep Ni, Yu & Zhang, 2025

Species
- 6, see text

Genus of spiders

Protaeus is a genus of spiders in the family Salticidae.

== Distribution ==
Protaeus is endemic to China.

== Etymology ==
The genus is named after Proteus, because of the "shape-shifting", variable nature of this genus' tibial apophyses.

== Species ==
As of January 2026, this genus includes six species:

- Protaeus dracosquamus Ni, Yu & Zhang, 2025 – China
- Protaeus forcipiformis (Yang, W. Liu, P. Liu & Peng, 2017) – China
- Protaeus gulliwingus Ni, Yu & Zhang, 2025 – China
- Protaeus jianfeng (Song & Zhu, 1998) – China (Hainan)
- Protaeus nyarlathotep Ni, Yu & Zhang, 2025 – China
- Protaeus shiwandashan (Wang, Mi, Li & Xu, 2024) – China
