= The Finding of Erichthonius =

Painting by Peter Paul Rubens

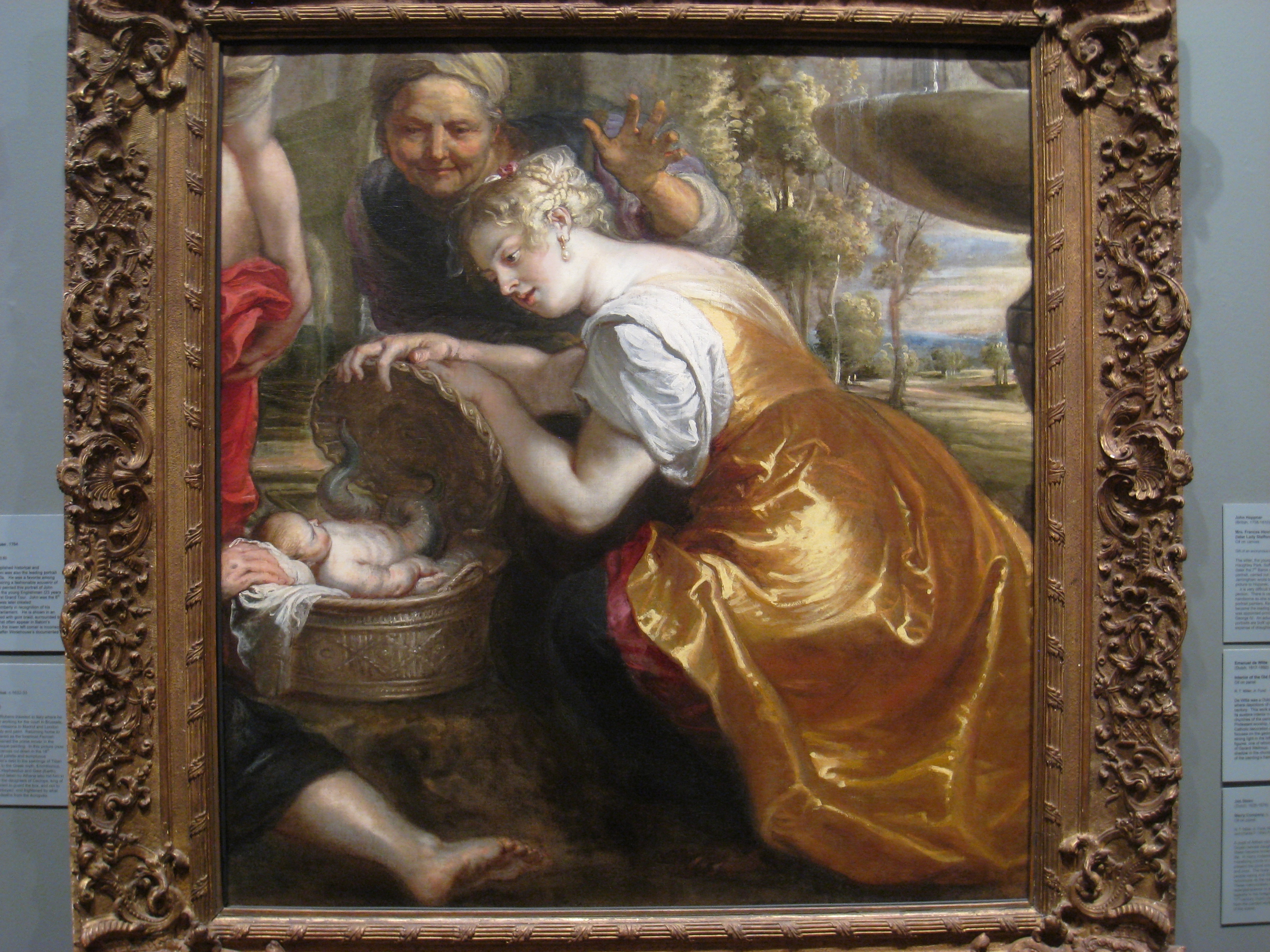
The Finding of Erichthonius (c. 1632–1633) by Rubens

The Finding of Erichthonius is a fragment of a larger painting by Peter Paul Rubens, produced around 1632 or 1633. It is now held at the Allen Memorial Art Museum in Oberlin, Ohio. It shows the discovery of Erichthonius in a basket by one of the daughters of Cecrops (either Pandrosus or Aglaulus).
