= Erichthonius Discovered by the Daughters of Cecrops (Jordaens) =

1617 painting by Jacob Jordaens

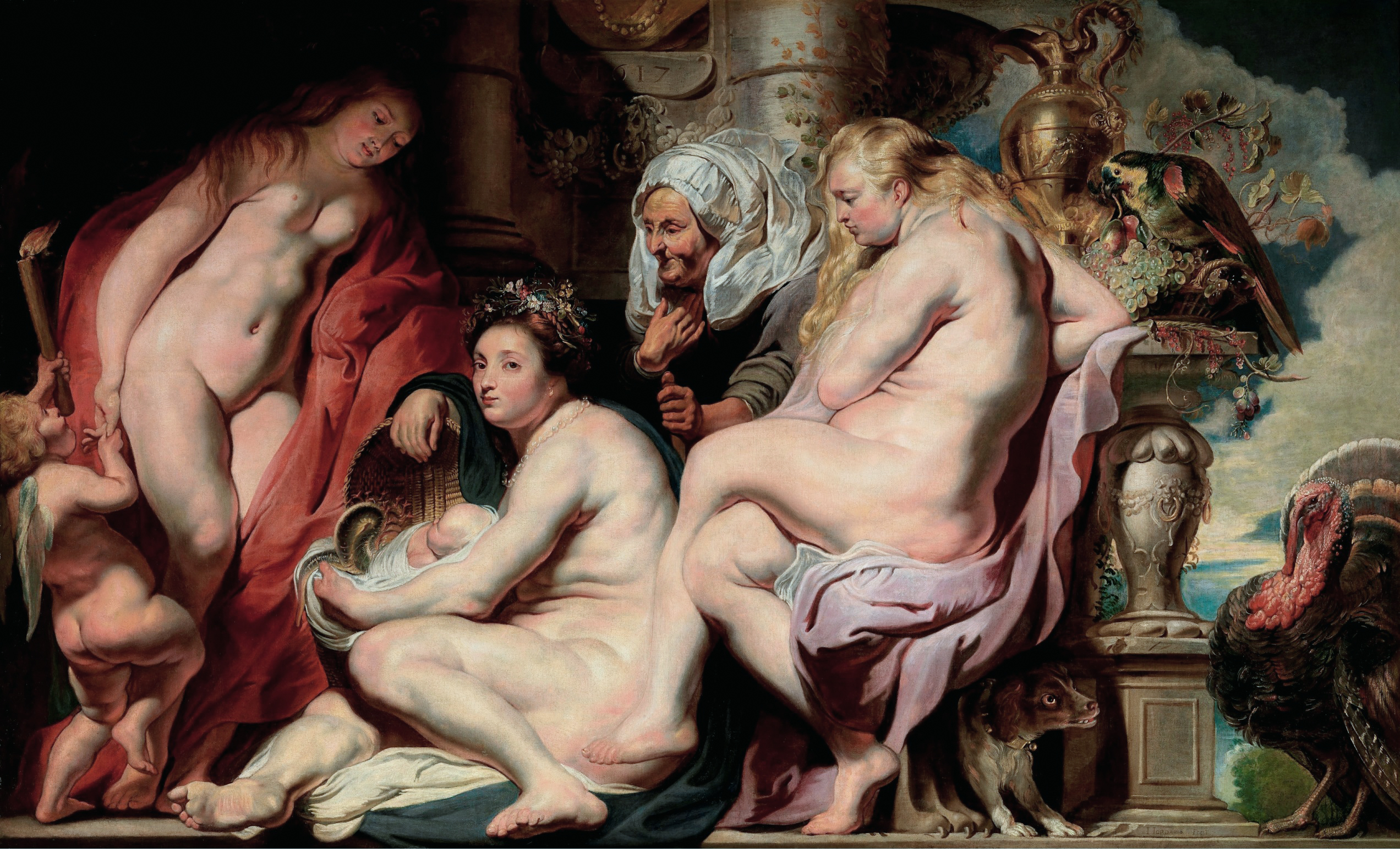
- Artist: Jacob Jordaens
- Year: 1617
- Medium: Oil on canvas
- Movement: Flemish Baroque
- Dimensions: 172 cm × 283 cm (68 in × 111 in)
- Location: Royal Museum of Fine Arts; Antwerp

Erichthonius Discovered by the Daughters of Cecrops is an oil-on-canvas painting by the Flemish painter Jacob Jordaens, from 1617. It is held in the Royal Museum of Fine Arts, in Antwerp.

The artist was then aged only 24 and still heavily influenced by Peter Paul Rubens, who had produced a version of the same scene in 1616. The work shows Hephaestus's son Erichthonius of Athens being discovered by the daughters of Cecrops I, derived from Ovid's Metamorphoses and the Library of Pseudo-Apollodorus. Jordaens returned to the same subject in 1640 in a work now in Vienna's Kunsthistorisches Museum.

== Sources ==
- Jordaens, la gloire d'Anvers, collection Beaux-Arts, Petit Palais, September 2013
