= Torone (mythology) =

Greek Mythology princess

In Greek mythology, Torone (Ancient Greek: Τορώνη, romanized: Torṓnē) of Phlegra, also called Chrysonoe (Χρυσονόη), was a Sithonian princess as the daughter of King Cleitus and Pallene.

== Family ==
She was the daughter of Cleitus and Pallene, the wife of Proteus, son of Poseidon and Phoenice, and the mother of Telegonus and Polygonus (or, according to another tradition, Tmolus).

== Mythology ==
Chrysonoe was given in marriage to Proteus by her father Cleitus after the Egyptian foreigner came to Thrace and became his friend. Chrysonoe's sons had the habit of guest-slaying which forced Proteus to pray for his father Poseidon to carry him back to Egypt away from them. Torone's sons were ultimately killed by Heracles when they challenged the hero to wrestle them.

The city of Torone in Sithonia was named after her.
