= Phoenice (mythology) =

Three characters in Greek Mythology

In Greek mythology, Phoenice (Ancient Greek: Φοινίκη, romanized: Phoenike or Phoiníkē) may refer to three distinct characters:

- Phoenice, an Attican princess as the daughter of the autochthonous King Actaion and sister to Aglauros, Erse and Pandrosos. According to the Suda, the ancient Greek historian Scamon of Mytilene claimed that her father named the Phoenician letters in her honor after she died a virgin.
- Phoenice, mother by Poseidon of Torone, wife of Proteus but more likely she bore Proteus to the sea-god. No parentage was attributed to Phoenice but she was probably a daughter or a descendant of Phoenix, eponym of Phoenicia.
- Phoenice, a dear companion of Artemis who was seduced (or raped) by Zeus. When she found out, Artemis turned her into a bear, and then later fixed her among the stars as the constellation Ursa Minor.
