= Proteus in popular culture =

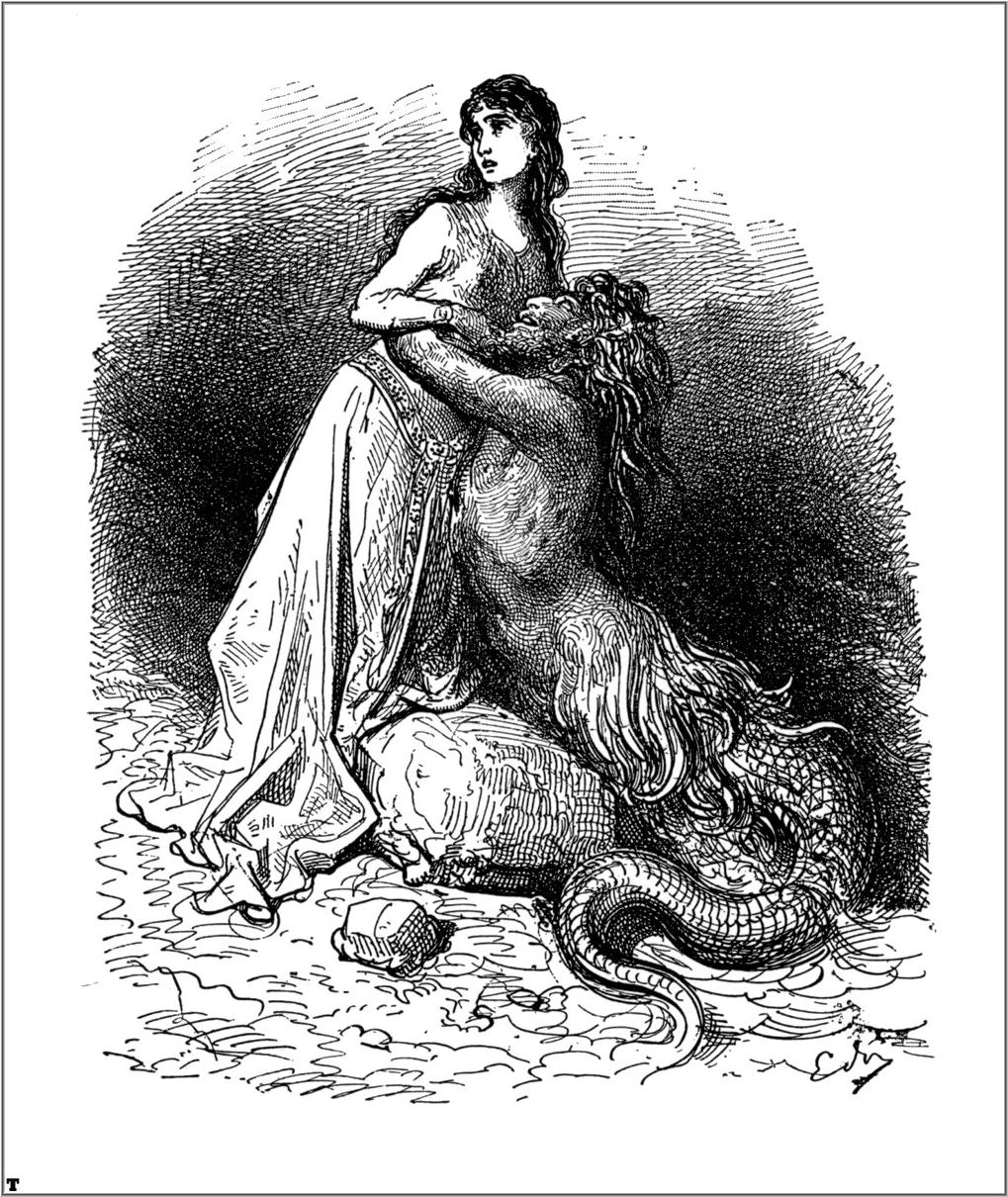
Gustave Doré’s illustration of Ludovico Ariosto’s Orlando Furioso, featuring Proteus

The Greek water god Proteus appears and is referenced often in popular culture.

== In modern fiction ==
- In the 1968 miniseries Odissea (dal Poema di Omero), an adaptation of Homer's Odyssey, Menelaus tells Telemachus that he learnt information about Odysseus from the prophet Proteus. He tells Telemachus that Proteus told him that Odysseus is lost in the middle of the seas with no ship and that his companions are dead, meaning he cannot return to Ithaca.
- In the 1980s adventure television series Airwolf, a U.S. Senator tells Dr. Charles Henry Moffett, "I'd like to shake your hand." Moffett replies, "You already have, Senator. On Project Proteus. "
- In Anne Ursu's book The Siren Song, the second book in The Cronus Chronicles, the Greek Proteus, an ally of Poseidon, disguises as protagonist Charlotte's cousin Zee to keep the fact from her that he has kidnapped Zee himself. He is also the father of Charlotte's crush, Jason Hart, a mortal who does not appreciate his father's shapeshifting abilities. Once Charlotte finds this fact, she abandons Jason.
- The term "Proteus" and "Vombis" are used in a James Blish short story, "A Hero's Life" about a race of shapeshifting aliens.
- In the film Fantastic Voyage, Proteus is the name of an experimental submarine which is shrunk to sub-cellular size and injected into a dying scientist to save his life.
- In the animated TV series The Real Ghostbusters, Proteus is a shape-shifting, lightning-throwing, primal god who captures the Ghostbusters in the episode "Janine Melnitz: Ghostbuster."
- In the animated TV series Gargoyles, Proteus is the shapeshifting menace and archenemy of the city of New Olympus in the episode "The New Olympians".
- Kurt Vonnegut's novel Player Piano revolves around the actions of Paul Proteus, a manager of a machine works in New York. Paul's life mirrors Proteus in that he must change his "shape" (character) to find his place in a machine-controlled society with which he is out of sympathy.
- In the film Lost in Space, "Proteus" is the name of the space ship that is sent to look for the Robinson family in an alternate time. The ship is subsequently destroyed.
- In another film, Demon Seed, the evil supercomputer is named "Proteus IV".
- In Craig Thomas' novel Sea Leopard, the British submarine is named HMS Proteus.
- In Harry Potter and the Order of the Phoenix, the Protean Charm is a spell used by Hermione Granger to enchant coins so that changing the serial number on one affected the others as well. She used it to communicate the times of secret meetings. It was also used by Voldemort to communicate with the Death Eaters.
- In the Marvel Comics series X-Men, Proteus is the villain identity of the mutant Kevin MacTaggert, son of Moira MacTaggert.
- In DC Comics, the Proteans are a blob-like species who were given shapeshifting abilities by the Llorn, an alien species who colonized their home planet. Chameleon Boy kept a Protean as a pet, whom he dubbed "Proty". After Proty sacrificed itself to resurrect Lightning Lad, Chameleon Boy obtained a new Protean pet, "Proty II". Later, Proty II became a member of the Legion of Super-Pets.
- In Rick Wakeman's song "The Battle/The Journey" Proteus is described as a giant prehistoric man who herds mastodons in the center of the Earth (itself an image from Jules Verne's Journey to the Center of the Earth)
- In Dean Koontz's Phantoms the character is referred to as being like Proteus by one of his victims.
- In Charles Sheffield's science fiction novels titled Proteus in the Underworld and Proteus Combined, Proteus refers to the process of using biofeedback equipment to change the shape of the characters' bodies.
- In James P. Hogan's novel The Proteus Operation, the term Proteus seems to relate to the ability to change time and reality, it that it is "flexible". He also uses it to refer to quantum mechanics, wherein it seems as if something changes to avoid being caught (i.e.: the act of measuring something changes it).
- In the Atraxa trilogy by Desmond Ravenstone, the Atraxa Defense Services use "proteon suits" which incorporate nanotechnology to sense the approach of a bullet or other high-speed projectile and change density so as to protect the wearer.
- In the Disney animated film Treasure Planet, Morph is stated to come from the planet Proteus 1, a reference to his shapeshifting abilities.
- In Rick Riordan's The Titan's Curse, Percy Jackson captures a Proteus-like man, Nereus, to ask where the monster that, when its entrails are burned, will give its wielder the power to destroy Mount Olympus.
- In Ralph Ellison's Invisible Man, Proteus is the middle name of the con artist Rinehart.
- In the children's TV series Thomas & Friends, Proteus is the name of a narrow gauge steam engine who once worked in the hills of the Island of Sodor.
- In John C. Wright's Chronicles of Chaos, Proteus is the father of Quentin Nemo.
- In Rudyard Kipling's "The Bees and the Flies", the poem recounts how a hero won a secret from Proteus.
- In the Showtime series Penny Dreadful, Proteus is the name chosen by Dr. Victor Frankenstein (Harry Treadaway)'s creation (Alex Price), when flipping through a book of Shakespeare's plays (presumably, The Two Gentlemen of Verona). The name has a double meaning - both to denote his closeness to Victor and using the name's nautical connotations as a reference to Proteus' previous life as a fisherman.
- "Proteus: The City" is the title of Book Four of Thomas Wolfe's autobiographical novel Of Time and the River.
- "Protean Challenge", an episode of Hercules: The Legendary Journeys, features Proteus.
- The alien character of Prot in the book trilogy by Gene Brewer and played by Kevin Spacey in the movie K-PAX, like Proteus was said to embody, was a modernized "shape shifter" and magical type of advanced mystical ET who "walked in" to humanoid bodies, and shared wisdom and insights into the human condition.
- The crew of the Jupiter 2 in the 1998 film Lost in Space encounter and board a derelict space station named the Proteus.

=== In gaming ===
- Proteus, the board game, was invented by Michael Waitsman in 1983 and is still published by Kadon Enterprises. The game is played on a 3 by 3 grid with nine tiles and six pieces. It is described as a brain-burning, rule-changing meta-game. It was rated one of the best new games of the year by Games Magazine. The board game was adapted for the iPhone by Paul Nord in 2012.
- Proteus was first used as the name of a roleplaying game published in 1992 by Bruce Gomes Industries and written by Bruce Gomes and Duncan Barrow. Non-standard races and an original world setting, using skill rolls under stats on 1d30. Currently out of print.
- Proteus is the name of a cross-genre roleplaying game. Proteus is a freely downloadable game available through Base113 Games. The game focuses on characters with incredible mental powers, Psionics. Proteus was a project to artificially create such people for military purposes. The name of the Greek god was chosen to reflect both the fact that these individuals are extremely adaptable and that they are among the first of their kind. An expanded version, Proteus: Second Edition, is currently in the works.
- Proteus is the name of an open world exploration game released in 2013 and created by Ed Key and David Kanaga. In it, the player explores a randomly generated island, drawn in a pixel art style. The lack of missions and goals has led some players to declare it an anti-game.
- The collectible card game Magic: The Gathering references Proteus in the card Proteus Machine from the Scourge expansion that is able to change its creature type to any type when it is morphed. Recently in the Dissension expansion, the creature Protean Hulk allows its controller to replace it with other creatures when it dies.
- Proteus is the name of an expansion for the collectible card game Netrunner.
- Proteus is the name of a key document in the computer game Freelancer.
- In the role-playing game Vampire: The Masquerade and Vampire: the Requiem, vampires of the Gangrel clan may possess a discipline named Protean that enables them to shapeshift into bats, wolves, mist and such, grow claws and see in the dark.
- In the Paragons setting for role-playing game Mutants & Masterminds, Proteus is a silvery shapeshifting paranormal. He is a paranormal supremacist with uncertain origins - everything from regular paranormal to shapeshifting alien to artificial construct made of nanomachines has been proposed.
- Protean, a villain in the City of Heroes franchise, takes his name from Proteus.
- In the game F.E.A.R., 'Proteus' is the name for a text file concerning the Icarus and Perseus Projects.
- In the game Culdcept Saga, a 'Protean Ring' tool will transform the user's creature into another random creature for the duration of the battle.
- In the MMORPG EVE Online, from the Apocrypha expansion onwards, the Gallente Strategic Cruiser is named the 'Proteus' Class. Strategic Cruisers (including those of other races) allow players to change the shape of the ship depending on the subsystems incorporated into its fitting. The in-game description of the 'Proteus' contains a fictitious excerpt that describes the freedom of life in space as a "protean existence".
- By shooting down the FB-22 ace Proteus on mission 18 of Ace Combat 5, the aforementioned aircraft's SP colours will be unlocked for the player to use.
- In the multiplayer role-playing game Rift, Proteus is a boss in the Planebreaker Bastion summoned from the Plane of Water.
- In Will Harvey's video game The Immortal, wearing the Protean Ring allows you to change into a different creature, which helps solve a puzzle.
- A gaming mouse made by Logitech is named the G502 Proteus Core.
- In the Pokémon franchise, there are several Pokémon who can have the ability Protean. When attacking, they change their typing to the type of that attack.
- In the 2017 Nintendo 3DS game Metroid: Samus Returns, the final boss is named Proteus Ridley, who is a cyborg version of Samus Aran's nemesis Ridley.
- The 2026 action-adventure survival game Subnautica 2 takes place on an ocean moon called Proteus.

== In history ==
The German–American scientist Carl August Rudolph Steinmetz, who had several physical disabilities, changed his name to Charles Proteus Steinmetz. This name reflected his identification with a figure that could easily alter its outward form.

== In biology ==
The olm, a cave-dwelling aquatic salamander native to southern and southwestern Europe, derives its scientific name Proteus anguinus from the deity.

== Other ==
Proteus Lake in Antarctica is named after the deity.

Progress Wrestling has a belt named after Proteus, the Proteus Championship.
