= Pluto (mother of Tantalus) =

Greek mythological figure

In Greek mythology, Pluto or Plouto (Ancient Greek: Πλουτώ, romanized: Ploutṓ) was the mother of Tantalus, usually by Zeus, though the scholion to line 5 of Euripides' play Orestes names Tmolos as the father. According to Hyginus, Pluto's father was Himas, while other sources give her father as Cronus.

According to the Clementine Recognitions, the mother of Tantalus, called either Plutis or Plute, was the daughter of Atlas. Nonnus, calling her "Berecyntian Pluto", associates her with Berecyntus, a mountain in Phrygia sacred to Cybele. Nonnus's Dionysiaca has Zeus, hurrying "to Pluto's bed" to sire Tantalus, hide his thunderbolts in a cave, which the monster Typhon finds and steals, which leads to Typhon's cataclysmic battle with Zeus.
