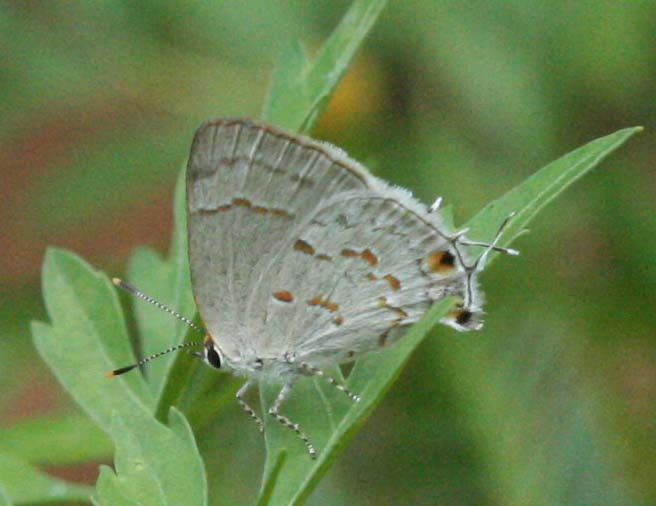

Scientific classification
- Kingdom: Animalia
- Phylum: Arthropoda
- Class: Insecta
- Order: Lepidoptera
- Family: Lycaenidae
- Genus: Tmolus
- Species: T. echion

Binomial name
- Tmolus echion (Linnaeus, 1767)

Synonyms
- Papilio echion Linnaeus, 1767; Ministrymon echion; Thecla echion; Papilio crolus Stoll, [1780]; Thecla labes Druce, 1907; Thecla sanctissima Jörgensen, 1935; Thecla echion f. echiolus Draudt, 1920

= Tmolus echion =

Species of butterfly

Tmolus echion, the red-spotted hairstreak or larger lantana butterfly, is a butterfly in the family Lycaenidae. It is found from Brazil, north to Sinaloa and Tamaulipas in Mexico. Rare strays can be found in southern Texas. It was introduced to Hawaii in 1902 to control lantana.

The wingspan is 22–32 mm. Adults are on wing in May in southern Texas and year-round in Hawaii and Mexico. Adults feed on flower nectar.

The larvae feed on various tropical plants including verbena, mint and potato species.

== Subspecies ==
- Tmolus echion echion
- Tmolus echion echiolus (Draudt, 1920) (Mexico)
