= Telegonus =

Mythological Greek characters

Telegonus (/təˈlɛɡənəs/; Ancient Greek: Τηλέγονος, romanized: Tēlégonos, lit. 'born afar') is the name shared by three different characters in Greek mythology.

- Telegonus, a king of Egypt who was sometimes said to have married the nymph Io.
- Telegonus, son of King Epaphus of Egypt and brother of Libya.
- Telegonus, a Thracian son of Proteus by Torone (Chrysonoe) of Phlegra, daughter of King Cleitus of Sithones. He was the brother of Polygonus (Tmolus). Because of Telegonus' and his brother's great violence towards strangers, Proteus prayed to their grandsire Poseidon to carry him back to Egypt. They met their demise when they challenged Heracles to wrestle at the behest of Hera but lost their life in the battle.
- Telegonus, the youngest son of Circe and Odysseus.
