= Tmolus (son of Ares) =

Mythological king of Lydia

In ancient Greek legend and mythology, Tmolus (Ancient Greek: Τμῶλος, romanized: Tmôlos) is a legendary king of Lydia, a region in western Asia Minor. According to the story, Tmolus angered the goddess Artemis when he violated a follower of the goddess inside her temple, and she punished him with death. He might have also been the husband of Omphale, who inherited Lydia after his death.

Mount Tmolus was named after this king, though other personages were also associated with the mountain and Lydia. This Tmolus' story survives in late-antiquity paradoxographical accounts.

== Family and background ==
Tmolus was the son of the war-god Ares and Theogone, and a king of Lydia; it is not clear whether he is supposed to be the same as Tmolus, the Lydian king and husband of Queen Omphale, or a separate figure altogether. If yes, then Tmolus left governance of his kingdom to her after his passing. He had a son named Theoclymenus.

== Mythology ==
Tmolus, while hunting upon the mountain Carmanorion, chanced upon a virginal and beautiful nymph by the name of Arrhippe. He instantly fell in love with her, but she was an attendant of the maiden-goddess Artemis, so she spurned him. Unable to persuade the nymph via fair means, Tmolus decided to gain her by force. Arrhippe, having no other means of escape, fled to the temple of Artemis as a supplicant. Tmolus however did not revere the holy sanctuary of the temple, and raped Arrhippe inside. The nymph was so traumatised by the events that she took her life by hanging.

Artemis was enraged, and punished Tmolus' hubristic insolence severely. She let a mad bull loose against him, which savaged and tossed Tmolus around until the king expired upon stakes and stones in agony. Tmolus' son Theoclymenus found his father's body, gave him a proper funeral, and then changed Mount Carmanorion's name to Mount Tmolus in honour of the dead king.

== Interpretation ==
The myth of Tmolus and Arrhippe is only preserved in Pseudo-Plutarch's De fluviis (or Treatise on Rivers and Mountains), a second-century work by an author now known not to have been the actual Plutarch. This second-century work is today classified as paradoxography or a parody of paradoxography, and might have been written with a humorous, non-serious tone.

Suicide as a response to the shame over being raped is a common way of action among female rape victims in Greek mythology.

== See also ==
Other similar Greek myths:

- Clymenus
- Arge
- Medusa

== Bibliography ==
- Asomatou, Arezina; Tselempis, Athanasios; Bratis, Dionysios; Staurianakos, Kyriakos; Zapheiropoulos, Georgios; Pachi, Argyro; Moussas, Georgios, eds. (2016). "Οι αυτόχειρες στην ελληνική μυθολογία" [Suicides in Greek mythology] (PDF). Encephalos (in Greek). 53.
- Apollodorus, The Library, with an English Translation by Sir James George Frazer, F.B.A., F.R.S. in 2 Volumes. Cambridge, MA, Harvard University Press; London, William Heinemann Ltd. 1921. Online version at the Perseus Digital Library.
- Bell, Robert E. (1991). Women of Classical Mythology: A Biographical Dictionary. ABC-Clio. ISBN 9780874365818.
- Grimal, Pierre (1987). The Dictionary of Classical Mythology. Wiley-Blackwell. ISBN 0-631-13209-0.
- Hard, Robin (2004). The Routledge Handbook of Greek Mythology: Based on H. J. Rose's "Handbook of Greek Mythology". Routledge. ISBN 9780415186360.
- Pseudo-Plutarch (1878). Brady Kiesling (ed.). Names of Rivers and Mountains, in Plutarch, The Moralia. Translated by William Watson Goodwin.
