= Tmolus (mythology) =

Multiple Greek mythological figures

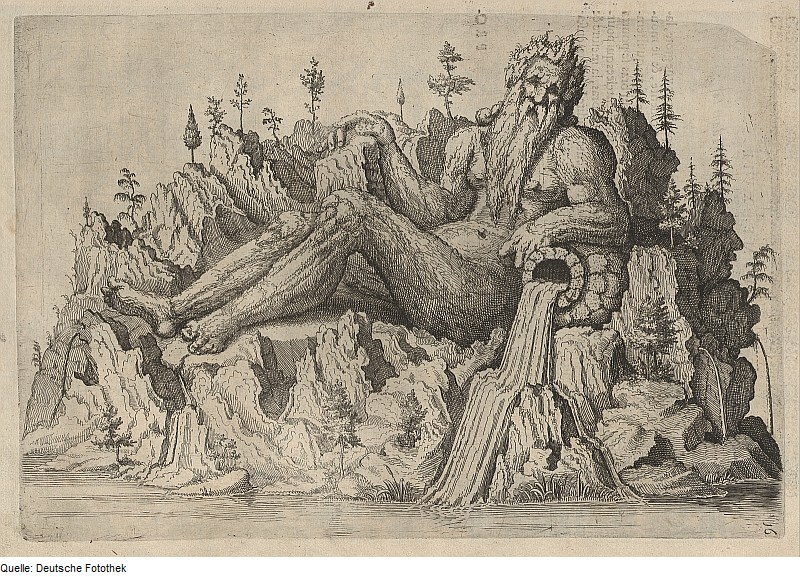
Engraving of Tmolus, the god of Mount Tmolus in Lydia, produced in 1615 by John Norton

In Greek mythology, Tmolus (/ˈmoʊləs/; Ancient Greek: Τμῶλος, romanized: Tmōlos) may refer to the following figures:

- Tmolus, a king of Lydia and the husband of Omphale, to whom he bequeathed his kingdom.
- Tmolus, the god of Mount Tmolus in Lydia, who was the judge of a musical contest between the gods Apollo and Pan (or the satyr Marsyas). When Tmolus awarded the victory to Apollo, Midas, the king of Phrygia, disagreed, and Apollo transformed Midas' ears into the ears of an ass.
- Tmolus, the father of Tantalus by Pluto, possibly the same as the god Tmolus. However, the father of Tantalus (by Pluto) was usually said to be Zeus.
- Tmolus, a son of Proteus, who along with his brother Telegonus was killed by Heracles. However, according to the mythographer Apollodorus, the two sons of Proteus killed by Heracles were named Telegonus and Polygonus.
- Tmolus, a king of Lydia, son of Ares and Theogone, perhaps identical with Omphale's husband. While hunting on a mountain, Tmolus raped the virginal Arrhippe, a nymph companion of the goddess Artemis, inside the goddess' very temple, who then hung herself. Angry, Artemis caused Tmolus to be killed by a raging bull. Theoclymenus, Tmolus' son, buried his father on the mountain, and the mountain was afterward called Mount Tmolus after him.
