= HMS Proteus =

Two ships of the Royal Navy and one of the Royal Fleet Auxiliary have borne the name Proteus, after Proteus, a sea-god in Greek mythology:

- HMS Proteus (1777) was a 26-gun sixth rate, formerly the East Indiaman Talbot, purchased in 1777 for use as a receiving ship. The ship was sold in 1783.
- HMS Proteus (N29) was a Parthian-class submarine launched in 1929 and sold in 1946.
- RFA Proteus is the first planned Multi-Role Ocean Surveillance Ship, purchased in 2022 for conversion and commissioning in 2023.
