= Phrygia (name) =

Name from Greek mythology

Phrygia was a daughter of Cecrops, from whom the country of Phrygia was believed to have derived its name.

Phrygia is also an epithet for Cybele, as the goddess who was worshipped above all others in Phrygia, and as a surname of Athena on account of the Palladium which was brought from Hellespontine Phrygia.

Phrygia was also a feminine personal name attested in ancient Athens, since ca. 500 BC

Phrygia is the name of Spartacus’ wife in Aram Kachaturian’s 1954 ballet Spartacus.

== Other uses ==
- Phrygia (plant), a taxonomic synonym of the genus Centaurea
- Phrygia, one of the seven Magypsies in the 2006 role-playing video game Mother 3
