= Erichthonius Discovered by the Daughters of Cecrops (Rubens) =

1616 painting by Peter Paul Rubens

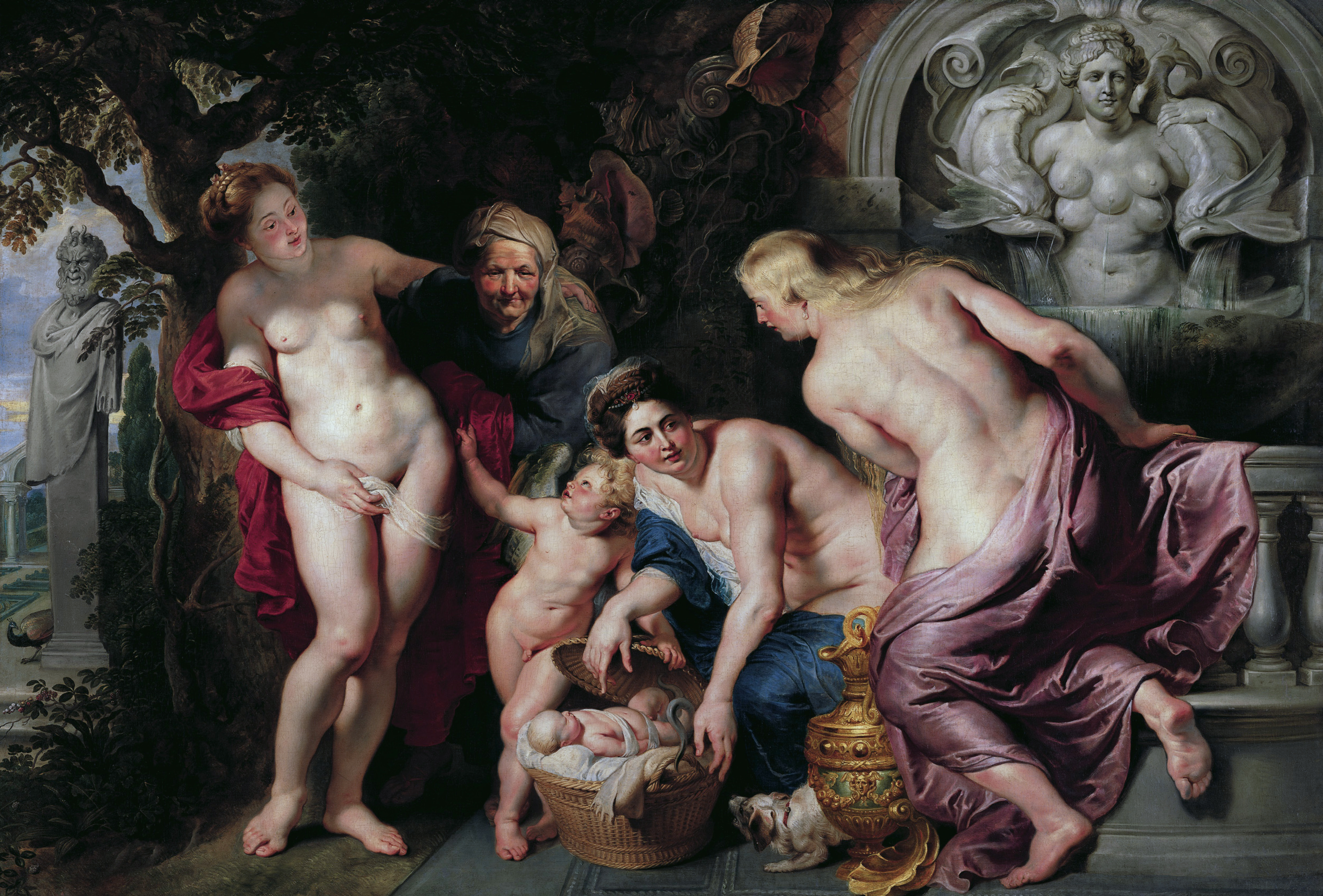
Erichthonius Discovered by the Daughters of Cecrops (1616) by Rubens

Erichthonios discovered by the daughters of Cecrops is a 1616 painting by Peter Paul Rubens. It shows Erichthonius of Athens discovered by the daughters of Cecrops, first king of Attica. It is now in the Liechtenstein Museum. In 1632, Rubens made another painting with the same theme; this painting is on display at the Nationalmuseum in Stockholm, Sweden.

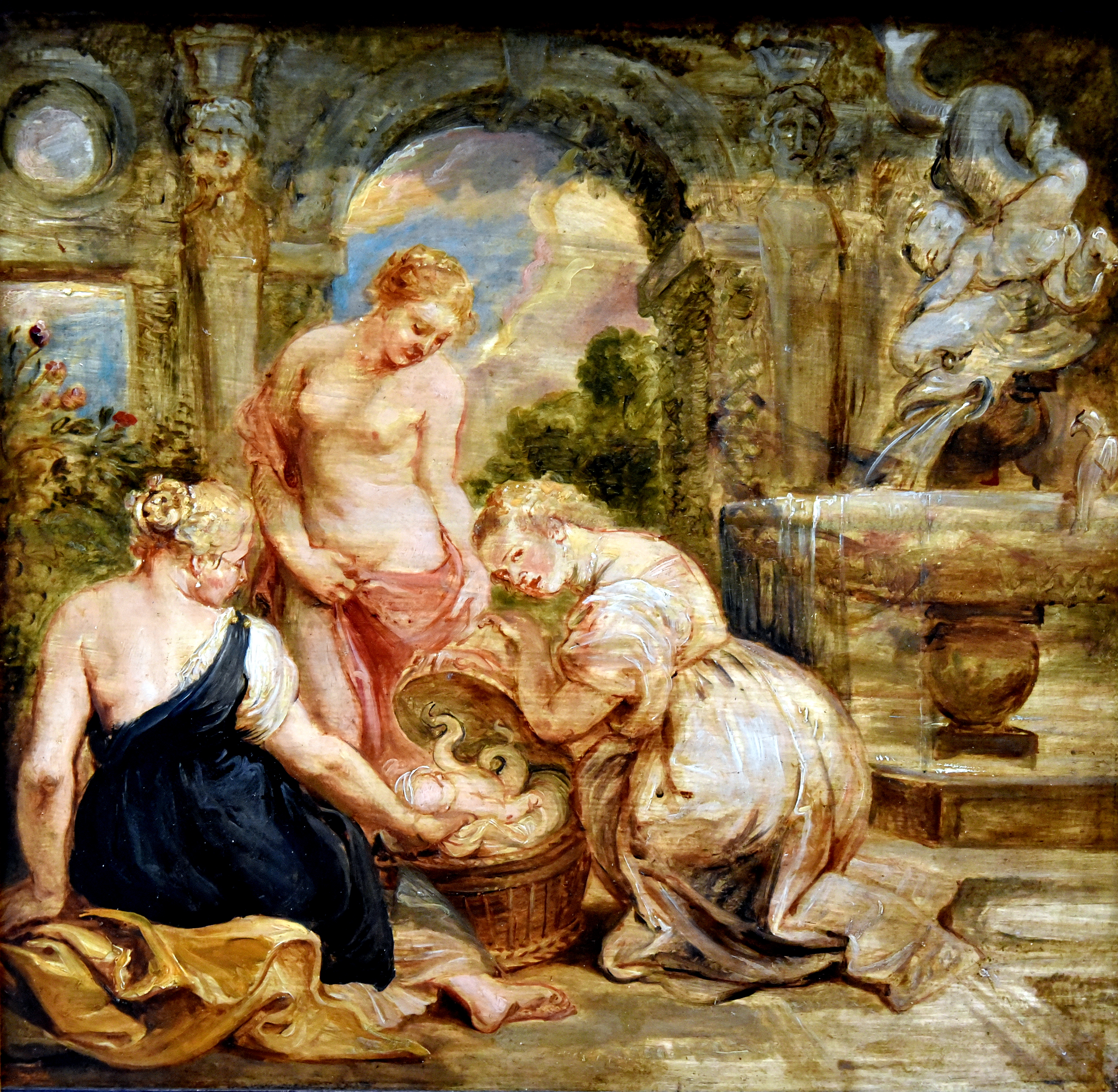
The Daughters of Cecrops Discovering Erichtonius (1632) by Peter Paul Rubens, Nationalmuseum, Stockholm
