= Actaeus =

Ancient Greek mythological King of Athens

In Greek mythology, Actaeus (/ækˈtiːəs/; Ancient Greek: Ἀκταῖος, romanized: Aktaîos, lit. 'coast-man'), also called Actaeon, was the first king of Attica, according to Pausanias.

== Legend ==
Actaeus was said to have ruled over the kingdom of Attica, named Acte (Ἀκτή Akte) or Actica.

The ancient Parian Chronicle states that Actaeus gave Aktike its name before it was changed to Cecropia by King Cecrops, and later became known as Attica. Another story tells that Atthis, a daughter of Cranaos, the king succeeding Cecrops in Athens, was Attica's namesake.

Actaeus (prior to 1582BC Parian) cannot be the same person as Aktaion (Grandson of Cadmus 1519BC Parian). Aktaion was the hero that saw Artemis bathing and she changed him into a stag. Afterwards, his own hounds killed him.

== Family ==
King Actaeus had four daughters named Aglaurus, Erse and Pandrosos, who all got offspring, but a fourth daughter, Phoenice, who died a virgin. The wife of King Actaeus is obscure.

According to the Byzantine Suda Lexicon, the ancient Greek historian Scamon of Mytilene claimed that Actaeus named the Phoenician letters in honor of his daughter Phoenice, who had died a virgin.

== Paleontology ==
Actaeus armatus, a Middle Cambrian (~505 MA) arthropod from the Burgess Shale, was named after Actaeus.

Regnal titles
Preceded by –	King of Athens	Succeeded by Cecrops I
