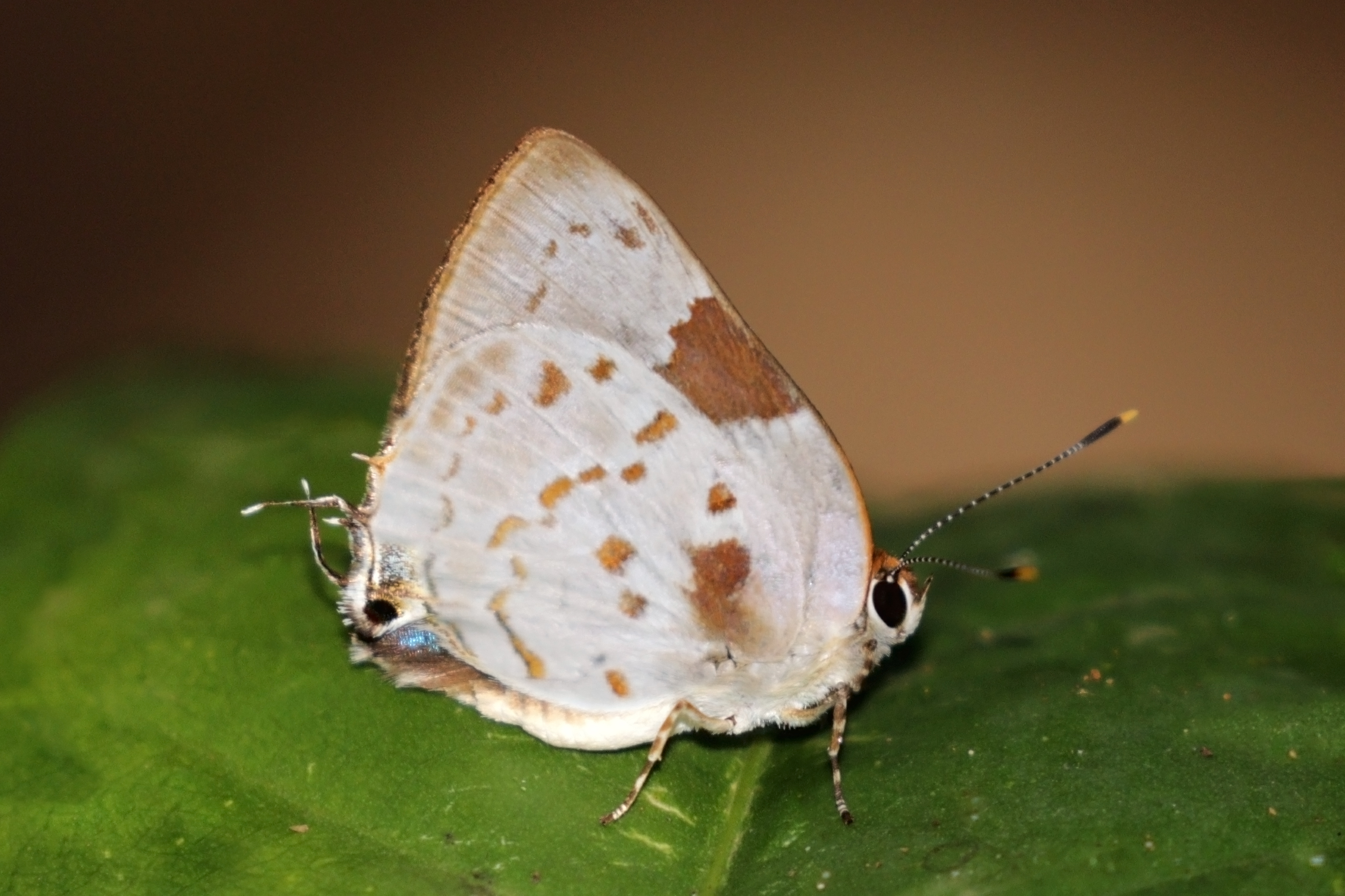
- In Panama

Scientific classification
- Domain: Eukaryota
- Kingdom: Animalia
- Phylum: Arthropoda
- Class: Insecta
- Order: Lepidoptera
- Family: Lycaenidae
- Tribe: Eumaeini
- Genus: Tmolus; Hübner, [1819]

= Tmolus (butterfly) =

Butterfly genus in family Lycaenidae

Tmolus is a Neotropical genus of butterflies in the family Lycaenidae. The genus was erected by Jacob Hübner in 1819.

== Species ==
- Tmolus crolinus Butler & H. Druce, 1872
- Tmolus cydrara (Hewitson, 1868)
- Tmolus echion (Linnaeus, 1767)
- Tmolus mutina (Hewitson, 1867)
- Tmolus ufentina (Hewitson, 1868)
- Tmolus venustus (H. H. Druce, 1907)
