= Melian relief =

Ancient Greek reliefs from the island of Milos

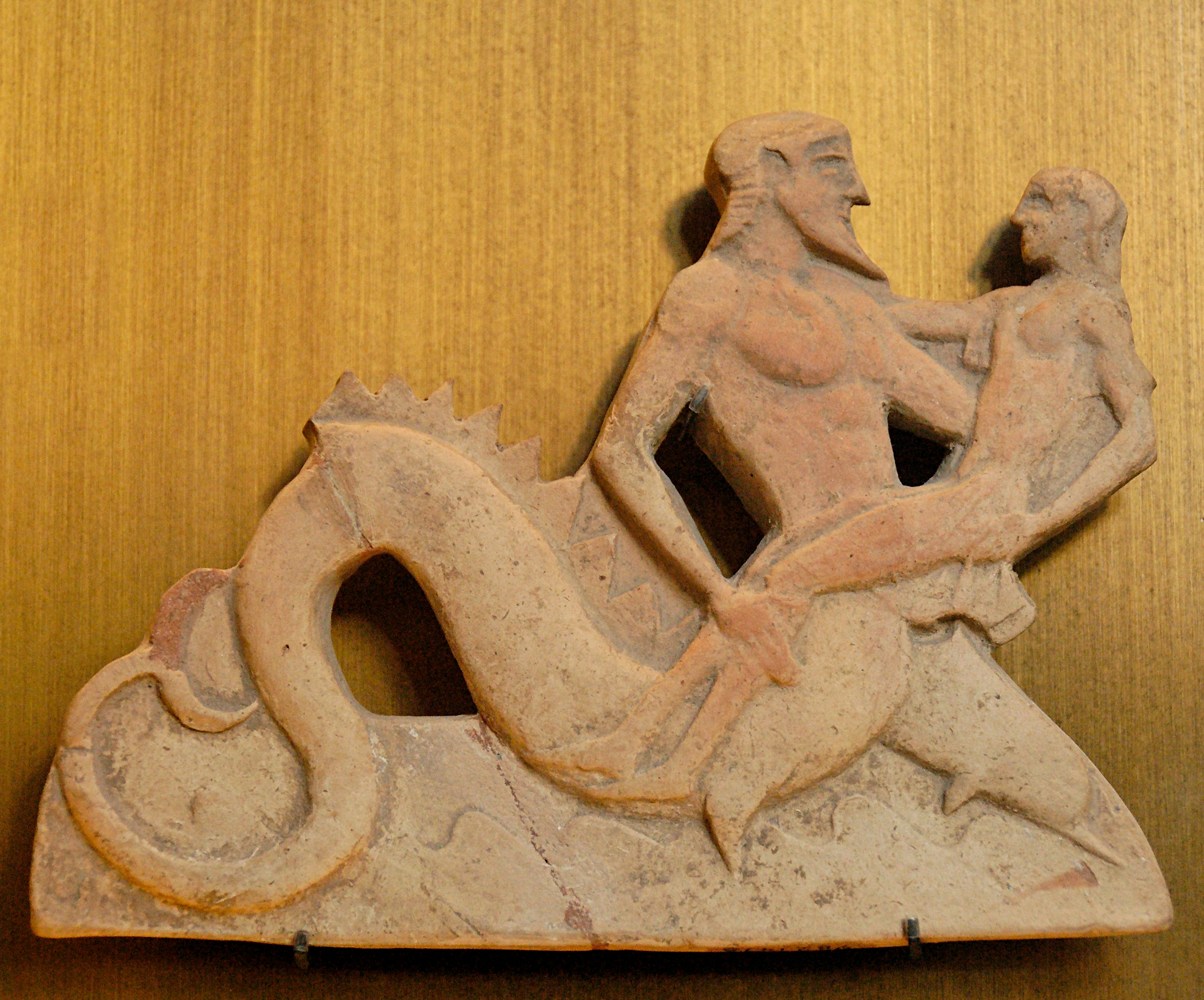
Triton carrying Theseus, Melian Relief

Melian reliefs were produced on the island of Milos from about 470 to 416 BC. Most of them were found on this island. They share the same technical features, with a shallow relief, not higher than 1.5 cm (0.59 in) and a flat back. Details were once painted, but the paint is now most often gone. They show most often narrative subjects from Greek mythology. They were perhaps made for wooden boxes Another option is, that they were placed on walls. providing an inexpensive imitation for reliefs made in more expensive materials, such as ivory. Many of them show holes for an attachment.

In 416 BC, Milos was ransacked by Athens in the Peloponnesian War. The population was sold into slavery. This is most likely the end of the production of the Melian reliefs.
