= Theogone =

Mother of Tmolus in Greek mythology

In Greek mythology, Theogone was the mother of the Lydian king Tmolus by Ares. Her son was gored to death by a mad bull as punishment for his crime against the nymph Arrhippe, one of the followers of Artemis.
