= Proteus =

Prophetic god of bodies of water in Greek mythology

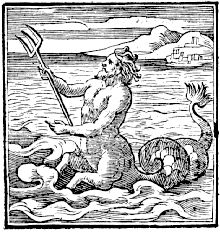
Illustration of Proteus by Andrea Alciato from The Book of Emblems (1531)

In Greek mythology, Proteus (/ˈproʊtiəs, ˈproʊt.juːs/ PROH-tee-əs, PROHT-yooss; Ancient Greek: Πρωτεύς, romanized: Prōteús) is an early prophetic sea god or god of rivers and oceanic bodies of water, one of several deities whom Homer calls the "Old Man of the Sea" (hálios gérôn). Because Proteus was a shape-shifter, modern scholars often view him as the physical embodiment of the ocean's constantly changing nature. He can foretell the future, but, in a mytheme familiar to several cultures, will change his shape to avoid doing so; he answers only to those who are capable of capturing him. From this feature of Proteus comes the adjective protean, meaning "versatile", "mutable", or "capable of assuming many forms". "Protean" has positive connotations of flexibility, versatility and adaptability.

== Name origin ==
Proteus's name suggests the "first" (from Greek "πρῶτος" prōtos, "first"), as prōtogonos (πρωτόγονος) is the "primordial" or the "firstborn". It is not certain to what this refers, but in myths where he is the son of Poseidon, it possibly refers to his being Poseidon's eldest son, older than Poseidon's other son, the sea-god Triton. The first attestation of the name is in Mycenaean Greek, although it is not certain whether it refers to the god or just a person; the attested form, in Linear B, is 𐀡𐀫𐀳𐀄, po-ro-te-u.

== Family ==
Proteus was generally regarded as the son of the sea-god Poseidon and Phoenice, a daughter of King Phoenix of Phoenicia.

The children of Proteus by Torone (Chrysonoe) of Phlegra were Polygonus (Tmolus) and Telegonus. They both challenged Heracles at the behest of Hera and were killed by the hero. Another son of Proteus, Eioneus, became the father of Dymas, king of Phrygia, father of Hecuba. By the Nereid Psamathe, Proteus fathered Theoclymenos and Theonoe (Eidothea or Eurynome). Cabeiro, mother of the Cabeiri and the three Cabeirian nymphs by Hephaestus, was also called the daughter of Proteus. Other daughters were Rhoiteia who gave her name to the city of Rhoiteion in Troad, Thebe who became the eponym of Thebes in Egypt and Thaicrucia who mothered Nympheus by Zeus.

== Mythology ==
=== Proteus, prophetic sea-god ===
According to Homer (Odyssey iv: 365), the sandy island of Pharos situated off the coast of the Nile Delta was the home of Proteus, the oracular Old Man of the Sea and herdsman of the sea-beasts. In the Odyssey, Menelaus relates to Telemachus that he had been becalmed here on his journey home from the Trojan War. He learned from Proteus's daughter Eidothea ("the very image of the Goddess"), that if he could capture her father, he could force him to reveal which of the gods he had offended and how he could propitiate them and return home. Proteus emerged from the sea to sleep among his colony of seals, but Menelaus was successful in holding him, though Proteus took the forms of a lion, a serpent, a leopard, a pig, even of water or a tree. Proteus then answered truthfully, further informing Menelaus that his brother Agamemnon had been murdered on his return home, that Ajax the Lesser had been shipwrecked and killed, and that Odysseus was stranded on Calypso's Isle Ogygia.

According to Virgil in the fourth Georgic, at one time the bees of Aristaeus, son of Apollo, all died of a disease. Aristaeus went to his mother, Cyrene, for help; she told him that Proteus could tell him how to prevent another such disaster, but would do so only if compelled. Aristaeus had to seize Proteus and hold him, no matter what he would change into. Aristaeus did so, and Proteus eventually gave up and told him that the bees' death was a punishment for causing the death of Eurydice. To make amends, Aristaeus needed to sacrifice 12 animals to the gods, leave the carcasses in the place of sacrifice, and return three days later. He followed these instructions, and upon returning, he found in one of the carcasses a swarm of bees which he took to his apiary. The bees were never again troubled by disease.

There are also legends concerning Apollonius of Tyana that say Proteus incarnated himself as the 1st-century philosopher. These legends are mentioned in the 3rd-century biographical work Life of Apollonius of Tyana.

=== Proteus, king of Egypt ===
In the Odyssey (iv.430ff) Menelaus wrestles with "Proteus of Egypt, the immortal old man of the sea who never lies, who sounds the deep in all its depths, Poseidon's servant" (Robert Fagles's translation). Proteus of Egypt is mentioned in an alternative version of the story of Helen of Troy in the tragedy Helen of Euripides (produced in 412 BC). The often unconventional playwright introduces a "real" Helen and a "phantom" Helen (who caused the Trojan War), and gives a backstory that makes the father of his character Theoclymenus, Proteus, a king in Egypt who had been wed to a Nereid Psamathe. In keeping with one of his themes in Helen, Euripides mentions in passing Eido ("image"), a daughter of the king and therefore sister of Theoclymenus who underwent a name-change after her adolescence and became Theonoë, "god-minded", since she was as it turned out capable of foreseeing the future—as such, she is a prophet who appears as a crucial character in the play. The play's king Proteus is already dead at the start of the action, and his tomb is present onstage. It appears that he is only marginally related to the "Old Man of the Sea" and should not be confused with the sea god Proteus, although it is tempting to see Euripides as playing a complex literary game with the sea god's history—both Proteuses, for example, are protectors of the house of Menelaus, both are connected with the sea, both dwell in Egypt, and both are "grandfatherly" or "ancient" figures.

At Pharos a king of Egypt named Proteus welcomed the young god Dionysus in his wanderings. In Hellenistic times, Pharos was the site of the Lighthouse of Alexandria, one of the seven wonders of the ancient world.

== Cultural references ==
Proteus as a cultural reference has been used in various contexts with different nuances according to each of the aspects of the myth: a shepherd of sea-creatures, a prophet who does not reveal their knowledge, a shape-changing god, the power to transform matter, or the primary matter that can become different materials. The adjective protean has come to mean versatile, ever-changing, or varied in nature.

=== In alchemy and psychology ===
The German mystical alchemist Heinrich Khunrath wrote of the shape-changing sea-god who, because of his relationship to the sea, is both a symbol of the unconscious as well as the perfection of the art. Alluding to the scintilla, the spark from ‘the light of nature’ and symbol of the anima mundi, Khunrath in Gnostic vein stated of the Protean element Mercury:

In modern times, the Swiss psychologist Carl Jung defined the mythological figure of Proteus as a personification of the unconscious, who, because of his gift of prophecy and shape-changing, has much in common with the central but elusive figure of alchemy, Mercurius. The quote below gives further elaboration.

Our Catholick Mercury, by virtue of his universal fiery spark of the light of nature, is beyond doubt Proteus, the sea god of the ancient pagan sages, who hath the key to the sea and ... power over all things.

— Von Hyleanischen Chaos, Carl Jung, vol. 14:50

=== In literature ===
The poet John Milton, aware of the association of Proteus with the Hermetic art of alchemy, wrote in Paradise Lost of alchemists who sought the philosopher's stone:

In vain, though by their powerful Art they bind
Volatile Hermes, and call up unbound
In various shapes old Proteus from the Sea,
Drain'd through a Limbec to his native form.

— John Milton, Paradise Lost, III.603–06

Shakespeare uses the image of Proteus to establish the character of his great royal villain Richard III in the play Henry VI, Part Three, in which the future usurper boasts:

I can add colours to the chameleon,
Change shapes with Proteus for advantages,
And set the murderous Machiavel to school.
Can I do this, and cannot get a crown?
Tut, were it farther off, I'll pluck it down.

— William Shakespeare, Henry VI, Part Three, Act III, Scene ii

Shakespeare also names one of the main characters of his play The Two Gentlemen of Verona Proteus.

In 1806, William Wordsworth finished his sonnet on the theme of a modernity deadened to Nature, which opens "The world is too much with us", with a sense of nostalgia for the lost richness of a world numinous with deities:

... I'd rather be
A Pagan suckled in a creed outworn;
So might I, standing on this pleasant lea,
Have glimpses that would make me less forlorn;
Have sight of Proteus rising from the sea.
Or hear old Triton blow his wreathèd horn.

James Joyce's Ulysses uses Protean transformations of matter in time for self-exploration. "Proteus" is the title provided for the third chapter in the Linati schema for Ulysses.

In Portuguese priest and poet Bento Teixeira's Epic poem Prosopopeia, Proteus sings to the other greek gods the successes and achievements of the House of Albuquerque.

=== In biology ===
A cave-dwelling aquatic salamander in Europe is called Proteus anguinus (referred simply as proteus or olm), and is the only species in the genus Proteus of the family Proteidae.

== Gallery ==
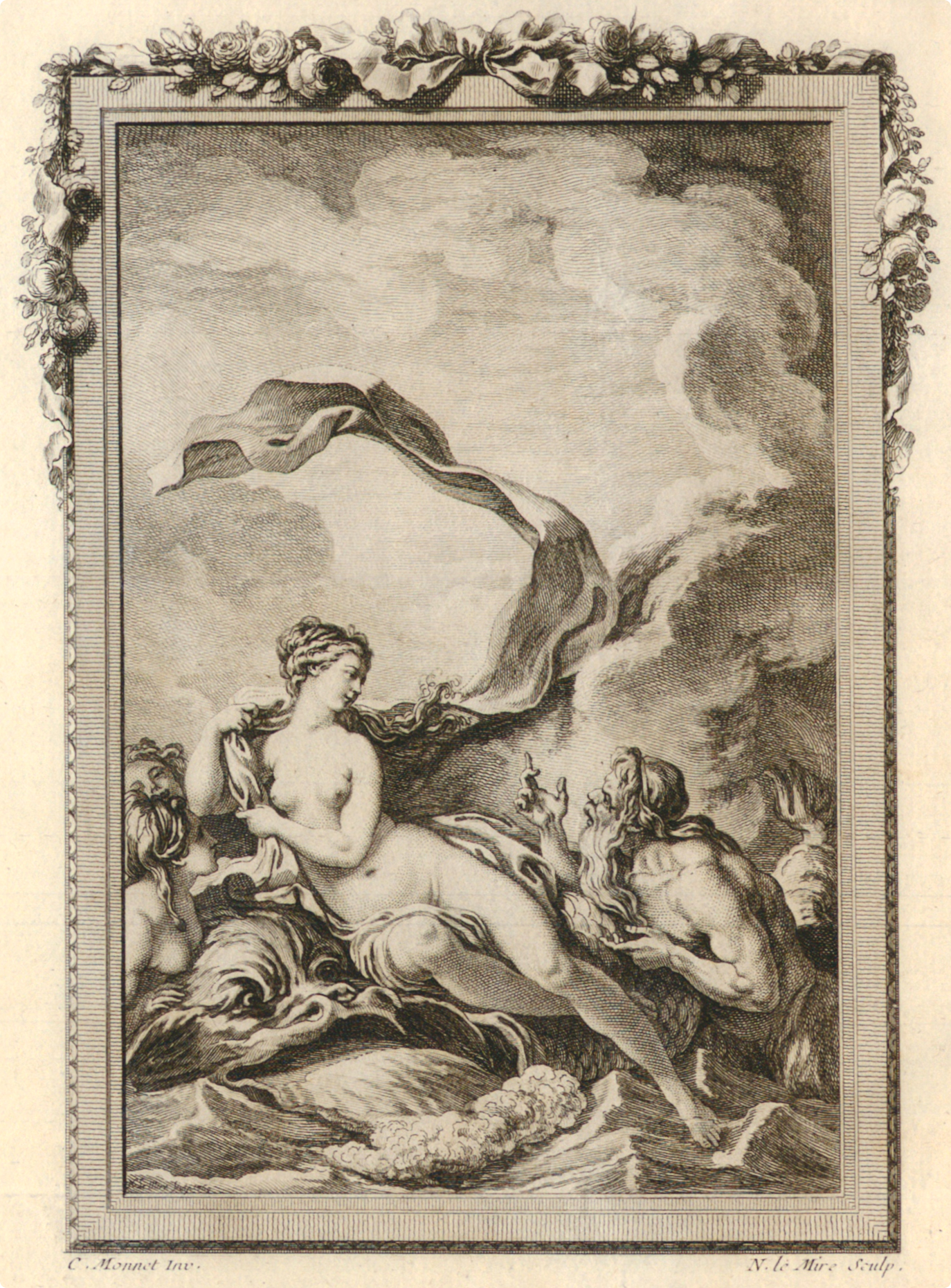
Thetis and Proteus by Noël Le Mire

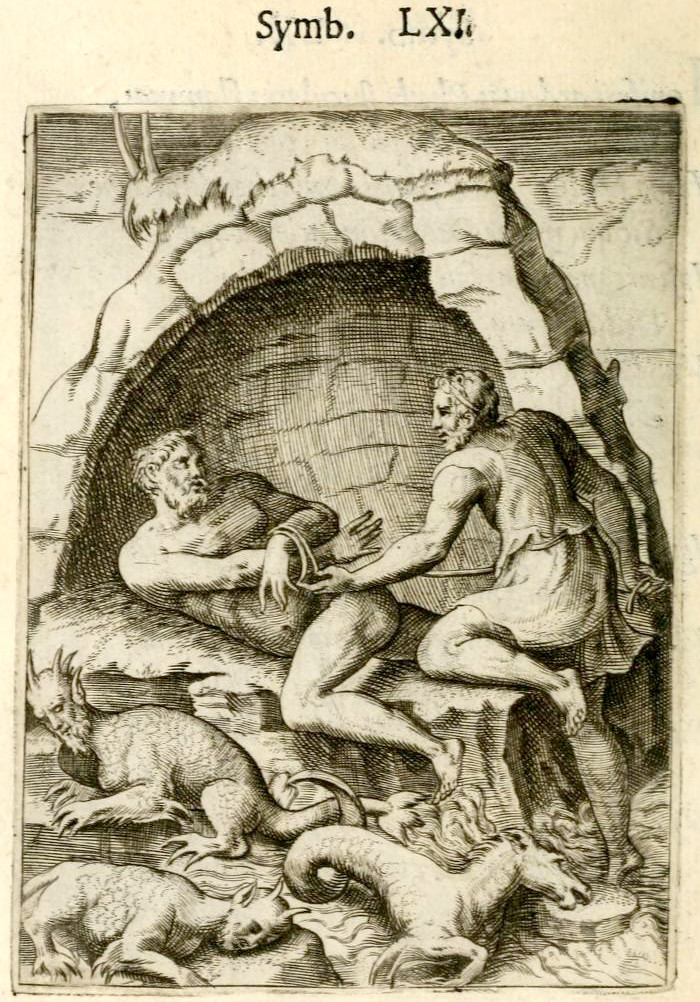
Menelaus and Proteus by Giulio Bonasone

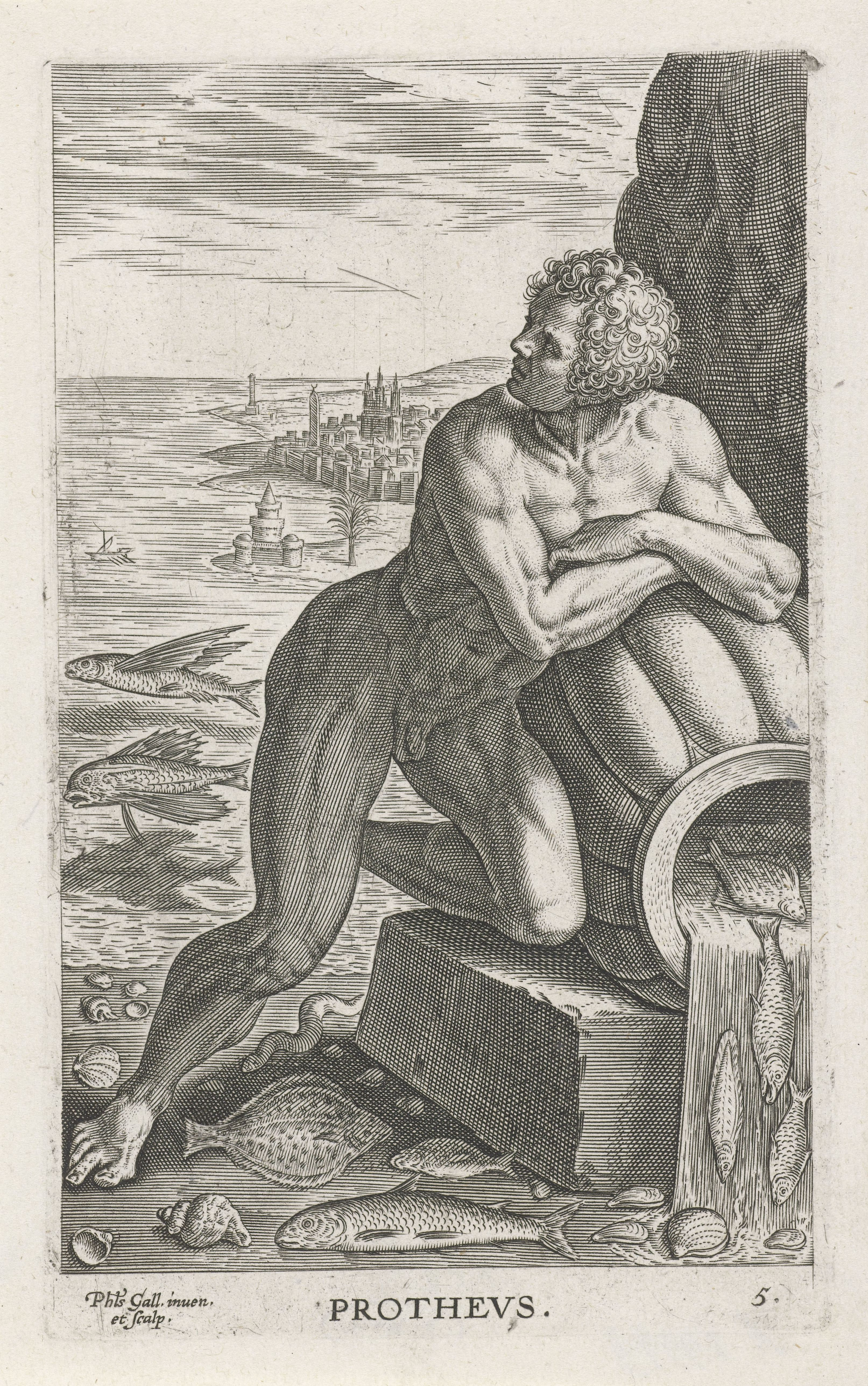
Seagod Proteus by Philips Galle

== See also ==
- Proteus in popular culture
- USS Proteus
- HMS Proteus
- Oresteia, section Proteus
- Proteus syndrome
- Proteus mirabilis
