= Polygonus (mythology) =

Son of Proteus in Greek mythology

In Greek mythology, Polygonus (Ancient Greek: Πολύγονος means 'prolific') was the Thracian son of the sea god Proteus by Torone, the daughter of Cleitus. He was the brother of Telegonus. Polygonus was also called Tmolus in some accounts.

== Mythology ==
Due to Polygonus' and Telegonus' "stranger-slaying wrestling", Proteus prayed to his father Poseidon to carry him back to Egypt away from them. Under the command of Hera, the brothers challenged the hero Heracles to wrestle but lost their lives in the battle.
