= Scamon of Mytilene =

Ancient Greek historian

Scamon (Ancient Greek: Σκάμων) of Mytilene was an ancient Greek historian. He wrote a treatise entitled Περὶ Εὑρημάτων (alternatively translated as about "discoveries" or "inventions"). According to the Suda, Scamon claimed that Actaeus named the Phoenician letters in honor of his daughter Phoenice after she died a virgin.

Athenaeus, in his work Deipnosophists, wrote that Scamon claimed that the satyric dance known as the Sicinnis was so named from ἀπὸ τοῦ σείεσθα ("being shaken"), and that its first dancer was Thersippus.
