= Cecrops I =

King of Attica in Greek mythology

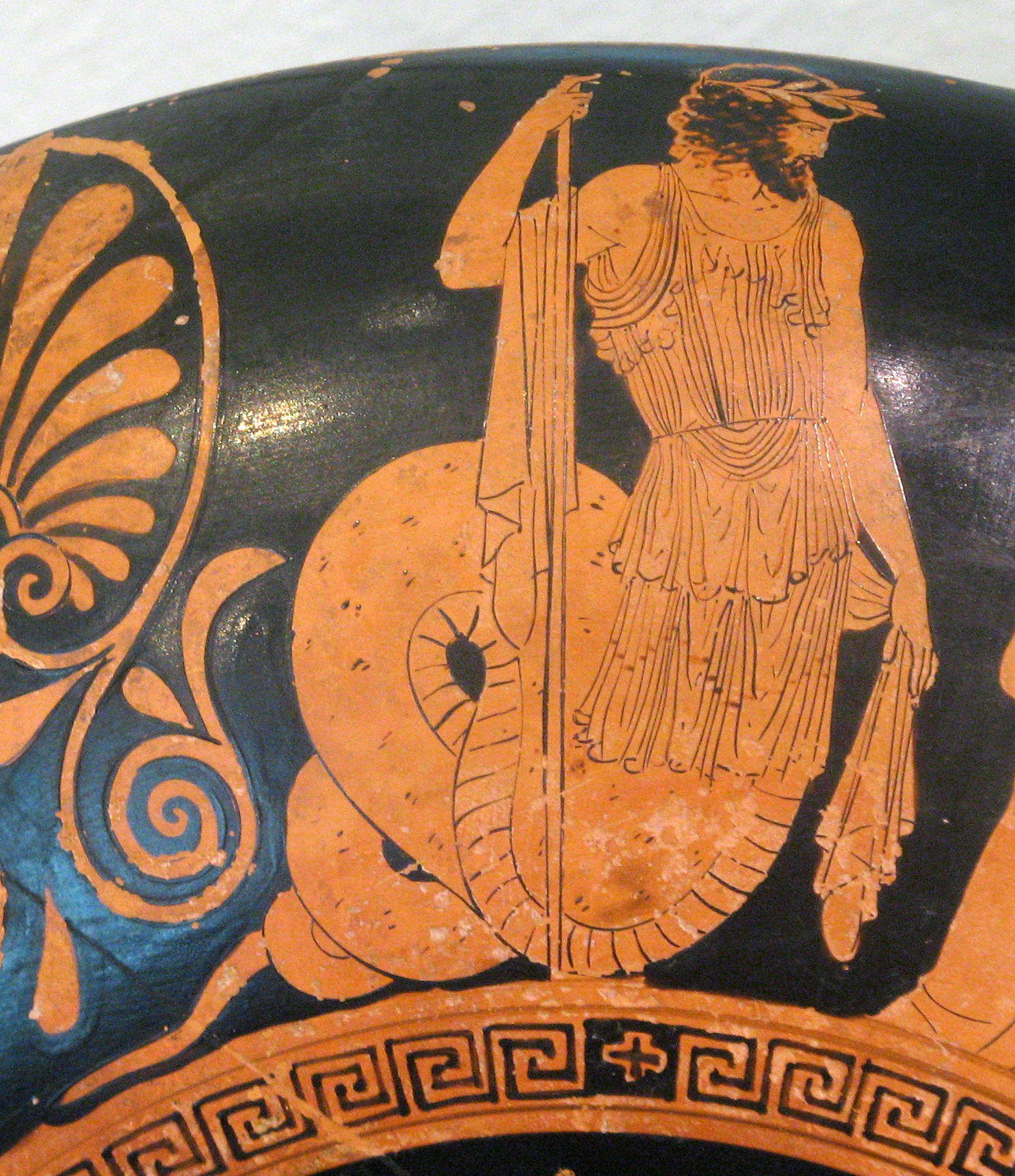
Cecrops on an Attic red-figure cup, c. 440–430 BC (Antikensammlung Berlin)

Cecrops (/ˈsiːkrɒps/; Ancient Greek: Κέκροψ, romanized: Kekrops; gen Κέκροπος, Kékropos) was a legendary king of Attica which derived from him its name Cecropia, according to the Parian Chronicle having previously borne the name of Acte or Actice (from Actaeus). He was the founder and the first king of Athens itself though preceded in the region by the earth-born king Actaeus of Attica. Cecrops was a culture hero, teaching the Athenians marriage, reading and writing, and ceremonial burial.

== Etymology and form ==
According to Strabo, the name of Cecrops is not of Greek origin. It was said that he was born from the earth itself (an autochthon) and was accordingly called a γηγενής (gēgenḗs "native"), and described as having his top half shaped like a man and the bottom half in serpent or fish-tail form. Hence he was called διφυής (diphuḗs, "of two natures"). Diodorus rationalized that his double form was because of his double citizenship, Greek and barbarian. Some ancients referred the epithet διφυής to marriage, of which tradition made him the founder.

== Family ==
Apparently Cecrops married Aglaurus, the daughter of Actaeus, former king of the region of Attica, whom he succeeded on the throne. It is disputed that this woman was the mother of Cecrops's son Erysichthon. Erysichthon predeceased him, and he was succeeded by Cranaus, who is said to have been one of the wealthiest citizens of Athens at that time.

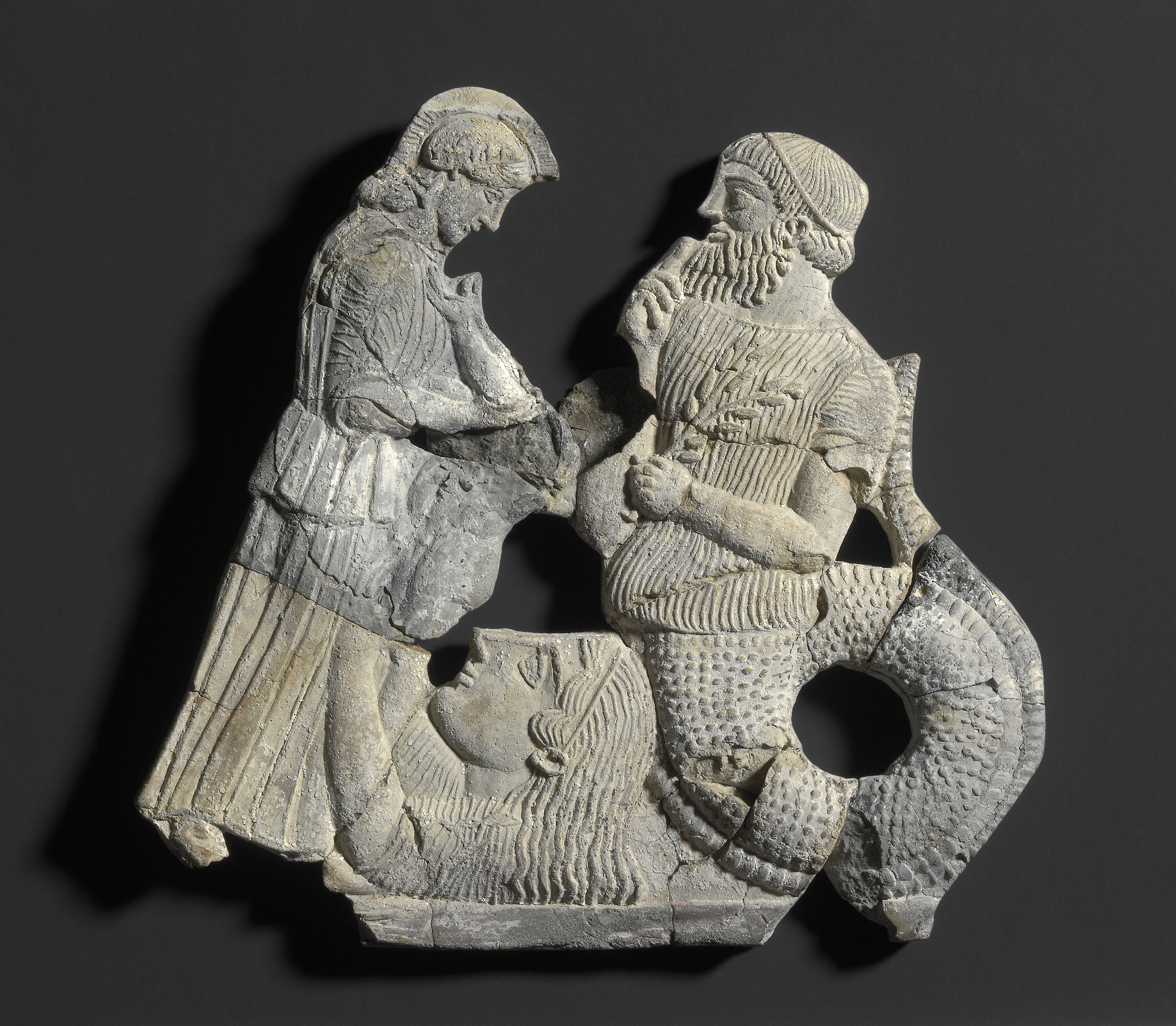
Melian relief of the birth of Erichthonios, c. 460 BC: Athena receives the infant Erichthonius from Ge, as Cecrops looks on (Berlin Antikensammlung)

Cecrops was the father of three daughters: Herse, Pandrosus and Aglaurus. To them was given a box or jar containing the infant Erichthonius to guard unseen. They looked and, terrified by the two serpents Athena had set within to guard the child, they fled in terror and leapt from the Acropolis to their deaths. Some accounts say one of the sisters was turned to stone instead.

== Mythology ==
=== In Attic mythology ===
Cecrops was represented in the Attic legends as the author of the first elements of civilized life such as marriage, the political division of Attica into twelve communities, and also as the introducer of a new mode of worship. He was said to have been the first who deified Zeus, and ordained sacrifices to be offered to him as the supreme Deity. Cecrops was likewise affirmed to have been the first who built altars and statues of the gods, offered sacrifices, and instituted marriage among the Athenians, who, before his time, it seems, lived promiscuously. Pausanias tells us that he forbade the sacrificing of any living creatures to the gods, as well as any sort of other offering, only allowing cakes (πέλανοι) formed into the shape of an ox with horns, called by the Athenians Pelanous, which signifies an ox. He is likewise said to have taught his subjects the art of navigation; and, for the better administration of justice and intercourse among them, to have divided them into the four tribes called Cecropis, Autochthon, Actea, and Paralia. Some likewise make him the founder of the areopagus.

The Acropolis was also known as the Cecropia in his honor. The Athenians are said to have called themselves Cecropidæ, during the reigns of the five following kings, in his honor.

=== Patronage of Athens ===
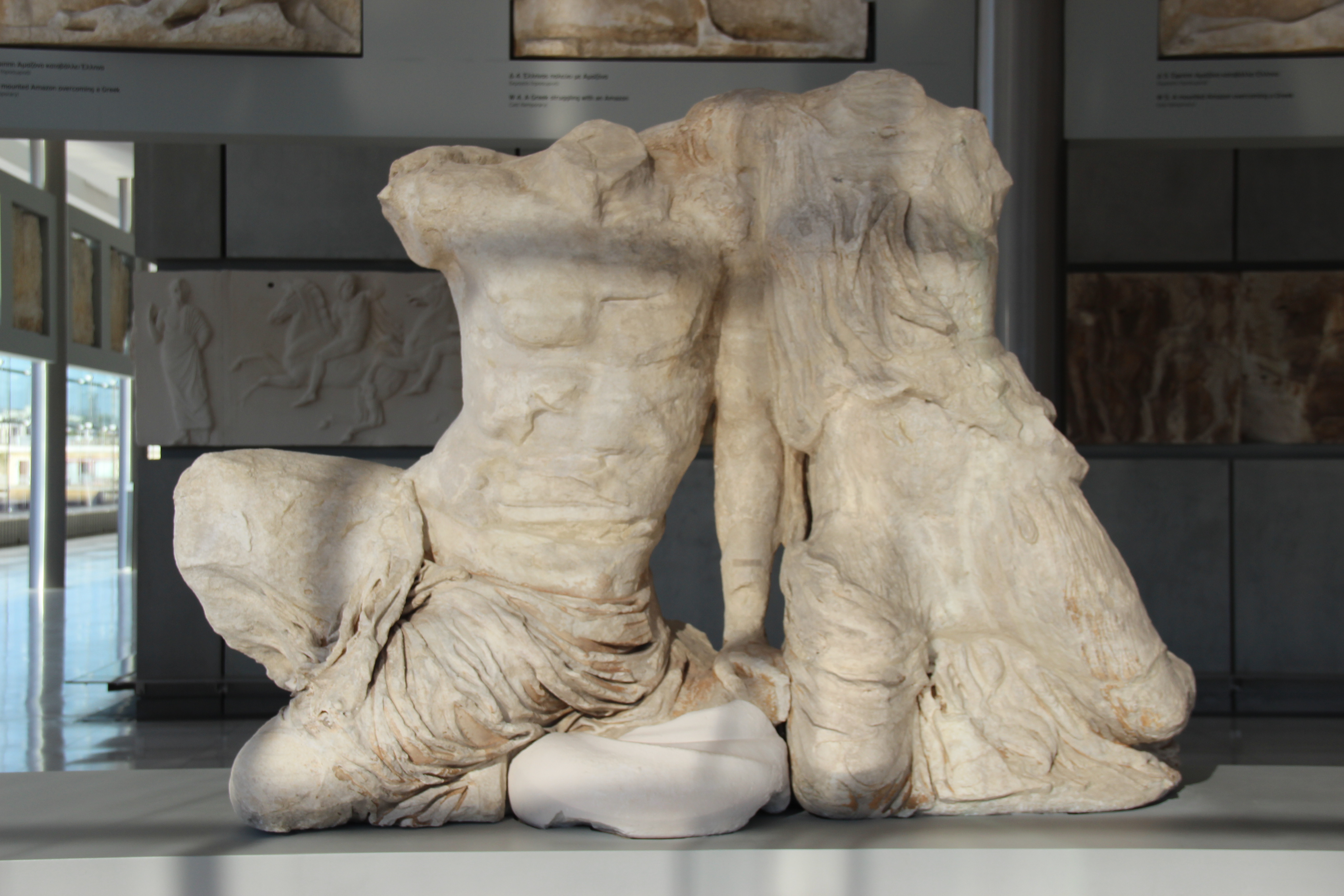
Figures from the west pediment of the Parthenon, traditionally identified as Cecrops with his daughter Pandrosus

During his reign, the gods resolved to take possession of cities in which each of them should receive their own peculiar worship. Athena became the patron goddess of the city of Athens in a competition with Poseidon, as judged by Cecrops. The two raced ferociously towards the Acropolis and it was a very close race. Poseidon was the first to reach Attica and struck the acropolis with his trident and thereby created a salt sea which was known in later times by the name of the Erechthean well, from its being enclosed in the temple of Erechtheus. After him, Athena arrived and called on Cecrops to witness her act of taking possession. She planted an olive tree on the hill of the acropolis, which continued to be shown in the Pandrosium down to the latest times. But when the two gods continued to strive for possession of the country, Zeus parted them and appointed arbiters - not, as some have affirmed, Cecrops and Cranaus, nor Erysichthon, but the twelve gods. And in accordance with their verdict the country was adjudged to Athena, because Cecrops bore witness that she had been the first to plant the olive. Athena, therefore, called the city Athens after herself. Poseidon in hot anger flooded the Thriasian plain and laid Attica under the sea.

A rationalistic explanation of the fable was propounded by the eminent Roman antiquary Varro. According to him, the olive-tree suddenly appeared in Attica, and at the same time there was an eruption of water in another part of the country. So king Cecrops sent to inquire of Apollo at Delphi what these portents might signify. The oracle answered that the olive and the water were the symbols of Athena and Poseidon respectively, and that the people of Attica were free to choose which of these deities they would worship. Accordingly, the question was submitted to a general assembly of the citizens and citizenesses; for in these days women had the vote as well as men. All the men voted for the god, and all the women voted for the goddess; and as there was one more woman than there were men, the goddess appeared at the head of the poll. Chagrined at the loss of the election, Poseidon flooded the country with the water of the sea, and to appease his wrath it was decided to deprive women of the vote and to forbid children to bear their mother's names for the future.

The Athenians said that the contest between Poseidon and Athena took place on the second of the month Boedromion, and hence they omitted that day from the calendar.

According to the 3rd-to-4th-century AD writer Eusebius, Cecrops's reign lasted for 50 years.

Regnal titles
Preceded by Actaeus	King of Athens	Succeeded by Cranaus

== Multiple Cecrops ==
The name of Cecrops occurs also in other parts of Greece, especially where there existed a town named Athenae, such as in Boeotia, where he is said to have founded the ancient towns of Athenae and Eleusis on the Triton River, and where he had a heroön at Haliartus. Tradition there called him a son of Pandion. In Euboea, which also had a town named Athenae, Cecrops was called a son of Erechtheus and Praxithea, and a grandson of Pandion. From these traditions it appears, that Cecrops must be regarded as a hero of the Pelasgian race; and Müller remarks that the different mythical personages of this name connected with the towns in Boeotia and Euboea are only multiplications of the one original hero, whose name and story were transplanted from Attica to other places. The later Greek writers describe Cecrops as having immigrated into Greece with a band of colonists from Sais in Egypt. However this account is rejected by modern scholars, as well as some ancient sources.

== See also ==
- Cecropia
- Fuxi
- Nüwa
- Phrygia
