= Mount Tmolus =

Mountain in Turkey

Coordinates: 38°19′23″N 28°06′08″E

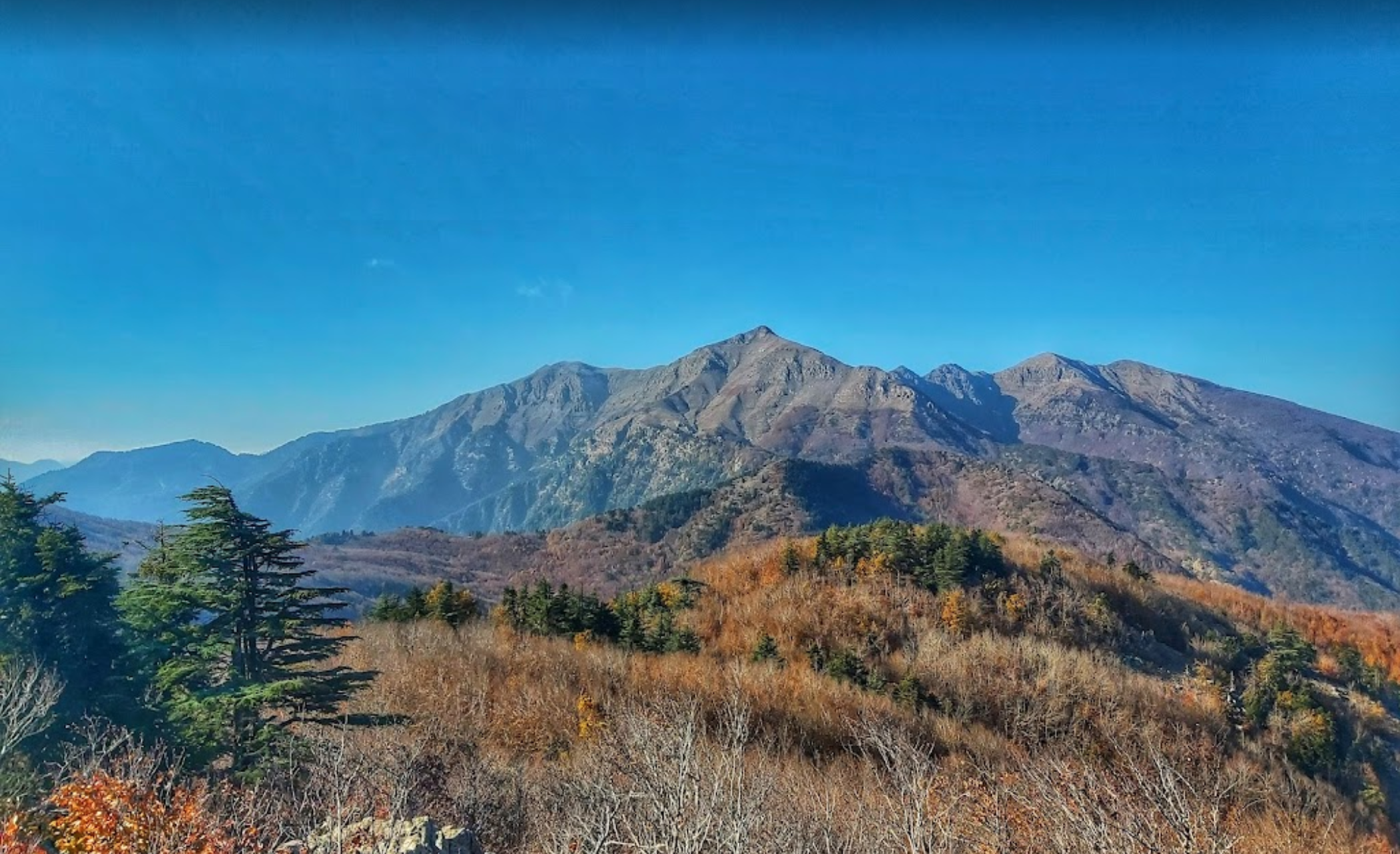
Bozdağ (ancient Mount Tmolus) is associated with the accounts surrounding Tmolus

Mount Tmolus or Bozdağ (Ancient Greek: Τμῶλος; Turkish: Bozdağ) is in "a mountain range on the south of Sardis, forming the watershed between the basins of the Hermus in the north and the Cayster in the south, and being connected in the east with Mount Messogis." It is named after Tmolus, King of Lydia. It is situated in Lydia in western Turkey with the ancient Lydian capital Sardis at its foot and Hypaepa on its southern slope. The mountain was "celebrated for its excellent wine-growing slopes. It was equally rich in metals; and the river Pactolus, which had its source in Mount Tmolus, at one time carried from its interior a rich supply of gold." The geography of Tmolus and the contest between Pan and Apollo, associated with the mythical Tmolus, son of Ares, are mentioned in Ovid's Metamorphoses, 11.168. Its peak is 2157 m.

== See also ==
- List of ultras of West Asia
