= Taygete =

Mythical character

- The Laconian Pleiad Nymph
- Member of the Pleiades
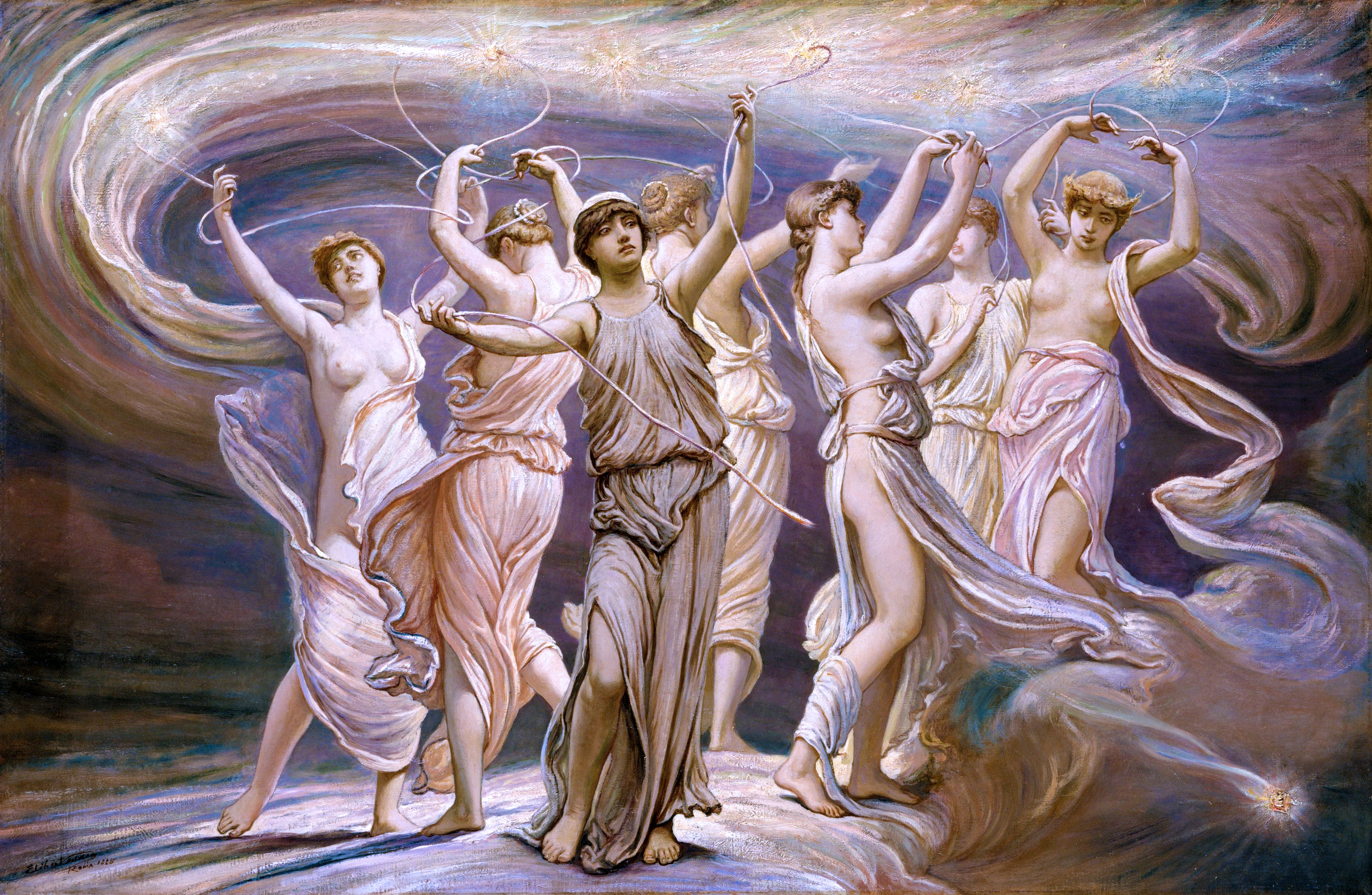
- The Pleiades by Elihu Vedder
- Abode: Mt. Cyllene on Arcadia, later Mt. Taygetos on Laconia

Genealogy
- Parents: (a) Atlas and Pleione or Aethra (b) Agenor
- Siblings: (a) Pleiades: Maia; Electra; Alcyone; Celaeno; Sterope; Merope; (a) Hyades: 1 include Dione or; 2 includes Thyone and Prodice or; 3 includes (i) Coronis, Cleeia (or Cleis) and Philia or (ii) Aesyle (or Phaisyle), Eudora and Ambrosia or; 5 includes (i) Aesyle (or Phaisyle), Coronis, Cleeia (or Cleis), Phaeo and Eudora or (ii) Aesyle (or Phaisyle), Coronis, Eudora, Ambrosia and Polyxo or (iii) Pytho, Synecho, Baccho, Cardie and Niseis; (a) Hyas
- Consort: (1) Zeus (2) Lacedaemon
- Children: (1) Lacedaemon and Eurotas (2) Himerus

In Classical Greek mythology, Taygete (/teɪˈɪdʒətiː/; Ancient Greek: Ταϋγέτη, Ancient Greek: [taːyɡétɛː], Modern Greek: [taiˈʝeti]) was a nymph, one of the Pleiades according to the Bibliotheca (3.10.1) and a companion of Artemis, in her archaic role as potnia theron, "Mistress of the animals", with its likely roots in prehistory. Mount Taygetos in Laconia, dedicated to the goddess, was her haunt.

The Taygetus mountain on the Peloponnese was named after her.

== Mythology ==
As he mastered each of the local nymphs one by one, Olympic Zeus pursued Taygete, who invoked her protectress Artemis. The goddess turned Taygete into a doe with golden horns, any distinction between the Titaness in her human form and in her doe form is blurred: the nymph who hunted the doe in the company of Artemis is the doe herself. As Pindar conceived the myth-element in his third Olympian Ode, "the doe with the golden horns, which once Taygete had inscribed as a sacred dedication to Artemis Orthosia", ("right-minded" Artemis) was the very Ceryneian Hind that Heracles later pursued. For the poet, the transformation was incomplete, and the doe-form had become an offering. Pindar, who was a very knowledgeable mythographer, hints that the mythic doe, even when slain and offered to Artemis, also continues to exist, to be hunted once again (although not killed) by Heracles at a later time. Karl Kerenyi points out (The Heroes of the Greeks) "It is not easy to differentiate between the divine beast, the heroine and the goddess".

According to Pausanias (3.1.2, etc.) Taygete conceived Lacedaemon, the mythical founder of Sparta, through Zeus, and Eurotas. Pausanias noted, at Amyclae, that the rape of Taygete was represented on the throne.

According to Pseudo-Plutarch, Taygete was the wife of Lacedaemon, sometimes referred to as Sparta, whose name was given to the city of Sparta. Their son was named Himerus.

In a rare variant of the myth, Taygete was called the daughter of Agenor.
