= Electra (Pleiad) =

One of the Pleiades in Greek mythology

- The Samothracian Pleiad Nymph
- Member of the Pleiades
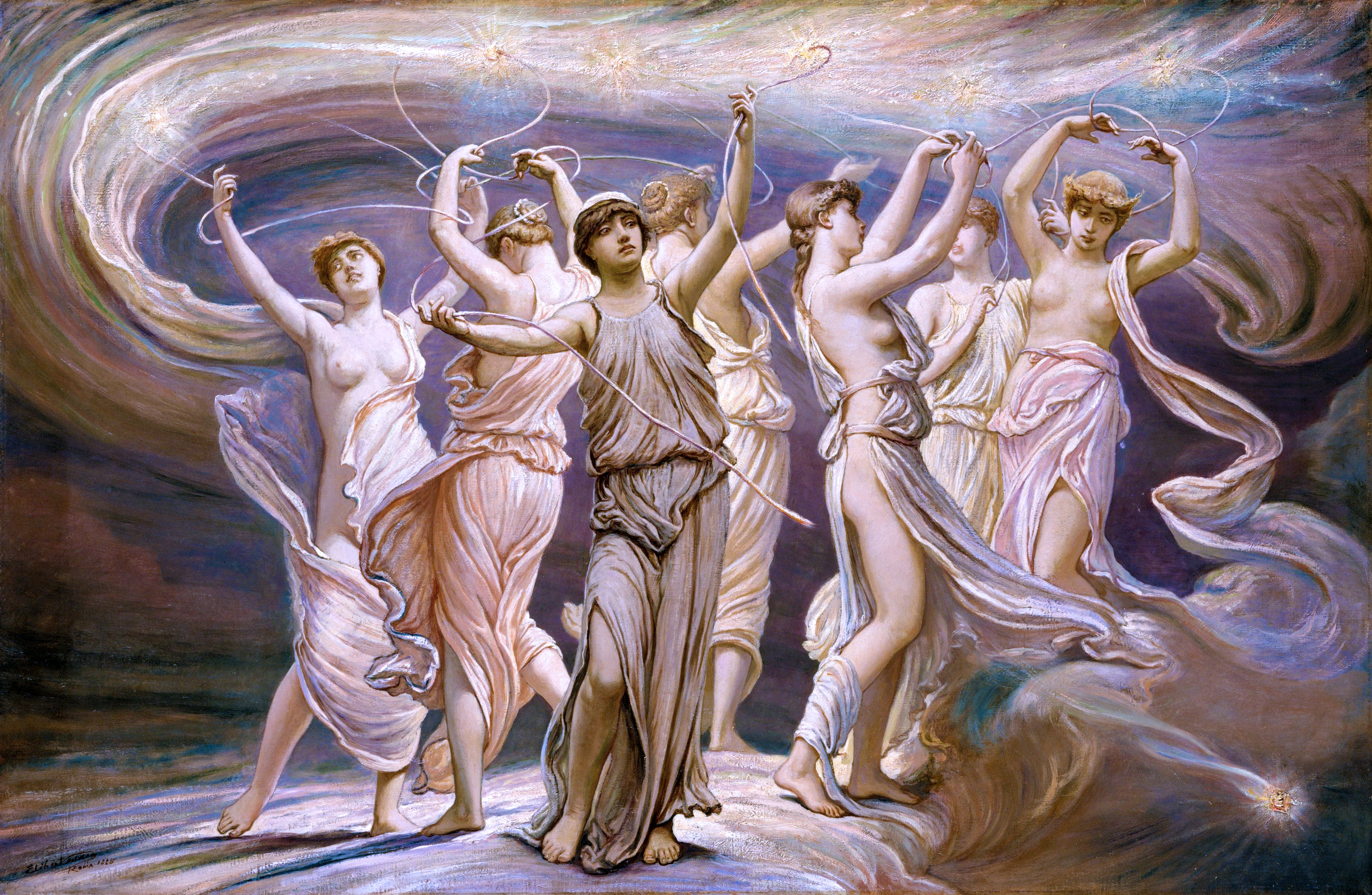
- The Pleiades by Elihu Vedder
- Abode: Mt. Cyllene on Arcadia or later Mt. Saon on Samothrace

Genealogy
- Parents: Atlas and Pleione or Aethra
- Siblings: (a) Pleiades: Maia; Taygete; Alcyone; Celaeno; Sterope; Merope; (b) Hyades: 1 include Dione or; 2 includes Thyone and Prodice or; 3 includes (i) Coronis, Cleeia (or Cleis) and Philia or (ii) Aesyle (or Phaisyle), Eudora and Ambrosia or; 5 includes (i) Aesyle (or Phaisyle), Coronis, Cleeia (or Cleis), Phaeo and Eudora or (ii) Aesyle (or Phaisyle), Coronis, Eudora, Ambrosia and Polyxo or (iii) Pytho, Synecho, Baccho, Cardie and Niseis; (c) Hyas
- Consort: (i) Zeus (ii) Corythus
- Children: (i) & (ii) Dardanus, Iasion (or Iasus or Eetion), Harmonia and (i) Emathion

In Greek mythology, Electra (/ɪˈlɛktrə/; Ancient Greek: Ἠλέκτρα, romanized: Ēléktra or Ilektra) was one of the Pleiades, the seven daughters of Atlas and Pleione. She lived on the island of Samothrace. She had two sons, Dardanus and Iasion (or Eetion), by Zeus.

Electra was connected with the legend of the Palladium, the sacred statue, which became the talismanic protector of Troy. Electra, along with the rest of the Pleiades, were transformed into stars by Zeus. By some accounts she was the one star among seven of the constellation not easily seen because, since she could not bear to look upon the destruction of Troy, she hid her eyes, or turned away; or in her grief, she abandoned her sisters and became a comet.

== Family ==
The Pleiades were said to be the daughters of Atlas, who was the son of the Titan Iapetos. No early source mentions their mother, but according to some late accounts she was the Oceanid Pleione. Hyginus' De astronomia says that Electra and her six sisters were called the Pleiades because, according to the 1st-century BC Greek scholar and historian Alexander Polyhistor, they were the daughters of Pleione. De astronomia also says that, according to Musaeus, their mother was instead an Oceanid named Aithra, explaining that they were called the Pleiades because there were more (pleion in Greek) of them than their sisters the Hyades. According to the mythographer Apollodorus, the Pleiades were born to Pleione "at Cyllene" (Mount Cyllene?) in Arcadia.

On the island of Samothrace, Electra had, by Zeus, a son Dardanus who left Samothrace and founded the city of Dardanus in the Troad. Through Dardanus, Electra was the progenitor of the Trojan royal line. She also had another son, by Zeus, Iasion (also called Eetion), who, because of an outrage against Demeter (or her statue), was blasted by Zeus' thunderbolt. The logographer Hellanicus also makes Electra the mother, by Zeus, of Harmonia the wife of Cadmus, although usually Harmonia is the daughter of Ares and Aphrodite. Nonnus also makes Electra the mother of Emathion, who succeeded his brother Dardanus as king of Samothrace.

According to an Italian tradition, Electra was the wife of the Etruscan king Corythus. Her sons Dardanus and Iasion were born in Italy, with Iasion being the son of Electra and Corythus, and Dardanus being the son of Electra and Zeus.

== Mythology ==
There are two stories involving Electra. One concerns the Palladium, the sacred statue of Pallas Athena, considered to be the divine protector of Troy (and later Rome). According to Apollodorus, Electra, seeking protection from Zeus, took refuge at the divine statue, but Zeus in his anger threw the statue from heaven. It landed near Troy, where Ilus, the founder of Troy, found the statue and built a temple to house and honor it. According to another version of the story Electra herself gave the statue to Dardanus as protection for Troy.

Another story involving Electra, concerns her, and her six sisters' transformation into stars. The reason for their transformation varied. According to one account, the Pleiades were being pursued by the huntsman Orion, intent on rape, but Zeus took pity on the sisters and placed them among the stars. And by way of explanation for the fact that only six of the seven stars in the constellation were readily visible, it was said that Electra, unable to behold the destruction of Troy, hid her eyes, or turned away; or, in another version, Electra, in mourning, let down her hair, and left her sisters altogether and became a "long haired star" (i.e. a "comet").

== Sources ==
=== Early ===
A constellation called the Pleiades is mentioned in Homer's Iliad and Odyssey and Hesiod's Works and Days, however none of the stars are named. Hesiod calls the stars the Atlageneis, possibly meaning "born from Atlas", although linguistic considerations suggests that the epithet refers to some geographic location. The lyric poet Simonides of Ceos (c. 556–468 BC), is the first (datable) source to connect the name of the star-cluster with the seven daughters of Atlas.

The names of the seven Pleiades are first attested in a scholion on Pindar, which quotes three hexameter lines from an unattributed poem, probably from the Hesiodic corpus:

lovely Taygete and dark-eyed Electra,
Alcyone and Asterope and godly Celaeno,
Maia and Merope, whom splendid Atlas begot.

Electra is also mentioned in the Hesiodic Catalogue of Women, where apparently she was said to be the mother of Dardanus and Eetion. The fifth-century Greek logographer Hellanicus of Lesbos provides more details. According to Hellanicus, Electra (called Electryone by Hellanicus) lived on Samothrace, where the locals called her Strategis. She had two sons by Zeus, Dardanus, and Eetion, who was also called Iasion. She also had a daughter Harmonia by Zeus, who was the bride of Cadmus, the founder of Thebes, and that because of this, the Thebans named one of the city gates (the Electran gates) after her.

The story of Electra and her sisters being transformed into stars may also have been told somewhere in the Epic Cycle. A scholion to the Iliad mentions the Pleiades escape from Orion by catasterism and says the following about Electra:

They say that Electra, being unwilling to watch the sack of Ilion [i.e. Troy] because it was a foundation of her descendants, left the place where she had been set as a star, so that whereas they had previously been seven, they became six. The story is found in the Cyclic poets.

=== Late ===
De astronomia is a Latin astronomical guide, attributed to Hyginus (died AD 17), containing the most complete surviving ancient compendium of astral mythology. It gives the following account of why only six of the seven Pleiades can be seen:

The Pleiades are said to be seven in number, but no one can see more than six of them. It has been suggested by way of explanation that, of the seven, six went to bed with immortals—while the other is indicated to have been the wife of Sisyphos. ... She [Merope] was placed among the stars thanks to her other sisters, but because she married a mortal, her star is faint.
According to other accounts, it is Electra who cannot be seen, for the following reason. The Pleiades led the chorus of the stars, so it is thought, but after the fall of Troy and the destruction of all who ere descended from her through Dardanos, Electra was overcome by grief and abandoned the company of her sisters to establish herself on the circle known as the arctic, and at long intervals she can be seen in mourning with her hair unloosed; for that reason she has come to be called a comet (long-haired star).

The Latin poet Ovid, in his poem the Fasti (c. AD 8), gives a similar account, but with a different explanation regarding Electra:

Seven are they [the Pleiades] usually called, but six they usually are; whether it be that six of the sisters were embraced by gods (for they say that Sterope lay with Mars, Alcyone and fair Celaeno with Neptune, and Maia, Electra, and Taygete with Jupiter); the seventh, Merope, was married to a mortal man, to Sisyphus, and she repents of it, and from shame at the deed she alone of the sisters hides herself; or whether it be that Electra could not brook to behold the fall of Troy, and so covered her eyes with her hand.

The mythographer Apollodorus (first or second century AD), discussing the "legend" of the Palladium", says that "Electra, at the time of her violation, took refuge at the image, and Zeus threw the Palladium along with Ate into the Ilian country; and Ilus built a temple for it, and honored it."

Nonnus, in the third book of his Dionysiaca (c. fifth century AD), has the wandering Cadmus land on Samothrace where he will find his bride to be, Electra's foster-daughter Harmonia. He arrives at the palace, "that masterly work of Hephaistos, which the industrious god once built for Electra as a bride", where he is received by Electra, the queen of Samothrace, and her son Emathion, who, with the departure of his brother Dardanus, is now "sole king". In answer to Electra's questioning, Cadmus tells her of the woeful abduction of his sister Europa, by Zeus, and order of his father Agenor to find his sister or never return home. Nonnus has Electra try to console Cadmus with the following speech:

"My guest, let sister and country and father pass into the whirlpool of Forgetfulness and un-remembering silence! For this is the way men's life runs on, bringing trouble upon trouble; since all that are born of mortal womb are slaves by necessity to Fate the Spinner. I am witness, queen though I am, if I was ever born myself one of those Pleiads, seven girls whom our mother once carried under her heart in labour, seven times having called Eileithyia at her lying-in to lighten the pangs of birth after birth—I am witness! for my house is far from my father's; no Sterope is near me, no Maia my companion, nor sister Celaino beside me at my hearth; I have not dandled up and down sister Taygete's Lacedaimon at my breast nor held the merry boy on my cherishing arm; I do not see Alcyone's house hard by, or hear Merope herself speak some heartwarming word! Here is something besides which I lament even more—in the bloom of his youth my own son has left his home, just when the down was on his cheek, my Dardanos has gone abroad to the bosom of the Idaian land; he has given the firstling crop of his hair to Phrygian Simoeis, and drunk the alien water of river Thymbrios. And away by the boundary of Libya my father still suffers hardship, old Atlas with chafing shoulders bowed, upholding the seven-zoned vault of the sky.
"Still and all with these great sufferings I feed a comfortable hope, by the promises of Zeus, that with my other sisters I shall pass from the earth to the stars' Atlantean vault, and dwell in heaven myself a star with my sisters six.

== See also ==
- 130 Elektra, asteroid
