= Seven Sisters (colleges) =

Group of historically women's colleges in the U.S.

The Seven Sisters is a group of seven private liberal arts colleges in the Northeastern United States that were historically women's institutions of higher education. Five remain women's colleges: Barnard College, Bryn Mawr College, Mount Holyoke College, Smith College, and Wellesley College. Of the other two Vassar College became coeducational in 1969, and Radcliffe College's undergraduate functions were absorbed by Harvard College when the institutions merged in 1999.

The name "Seven Sisters" is a reference to the Greek myth of the Pleiades, goddesses immortalized as stars in the sky: Maia, Electra, Taygete, Alcyone, Celaeno, Sterope, and Merope.

These colleges were created in the 19th century to provide women with a high-quality liberal arts education comparable to that offered by the historically all-male Ivy League colleges.

== History ==
In 1915, Vassar president Henry Noble MacCracken called together Vassar, Wellesley, Smith, and Mount Holyoke to work together "to deliver women opportunities for higher education that would improve the quality of life for the human family and that would put them on an equal footing with men in a democracy that was about to offer them the vote." The success of this informal association of colleges led to the decision to establish a larger and more formal group in 1926. That year Bryn Mawr, Barnard, and Radcliffe were added and the group gained the name "Seven Sisters" after the Pleiades. Together, their aim was to address financial inequality with elite men's colleges, in particular, the need to raise endowments so faculty salaries could approach those at top male institutions. The group launched coordinated fundraising and public-awareness efforts to secure better support for women's higher education. Through 1935, the colleges continued collaborating on fundraising while also using their meetings to exchange ideas on broader academic and student-life issues, such as undergraduate culture, governance, religion, and leisure.

The Seven Sisters colleges continue to collaborate through the Seven College Conference, which is hosted annually on a rotating basis by one of the seven original member institutions and brings together senior administrators and faculty around a theme. Recent topics have included the value of the Seven Sisters brand and issues of diversity, equity, and achievement. Although Radcliffe no longer participates and some schools, such as Vassar, have evolved from being primarily women's institutions, they share enough common history and institutional character to make ongoing collaboration meaningful and productive.

== Locations ==
The Seven Sisters

Four of the original Seven Sisters are in Massachusetts, two are in New York, and one is in Pennsylvania.

In Massachusetts, Mount Holyoke College and Smith College are part of the Five College Consortium with Amherst College, Hampshire College, and University of Massachusetts Amherst. Wellesley College is part of the Boston Consortium for Higher Education, established in 1995 and now comprising 23 institutions across New England. Wellesley College also allows students to cross-register with MIT, Babson College, Brandeis University, and the Olin College of Engineering. Radcliffe College shared a common and overlapping history with Harvard College from the time it was founded as "the Harvard Annex" in 1879. Harvard and Radcliffe integrated genders in 1977, but Radcliffe continued to be the sponsoring college for women at Harvard until the entities officially merged in 1999.

In New York, Vassar College ultimately became co-educational in 1969 and remains independent. Barnard College was Columbia University's women's liberal arts undergraduate college until its all-male coordinate school Columbia College went co-ed in 1983. Barnard continues to be a women's undergraduate college affiliated with (but financially, administratively, and legally separate from) Columbia. At graduation, students attend both a Barnard College commencement ceremony and a commencement ceremony that grants degrees to all students graduating from a Columbia-University-affiliated school. The diploma lists both Barnard College and Columbia University.

In Pennsylvania, Bryn Mawr College, along with Haverford College and Swarthmore College, make up the Tri-College Consortium, which belongs to the Quaker Consortium along with nearby University of Pennsylvania. Bryn Mawr students may attend classes at Haverford, Swarthmore, and Penn, and vice versa. A merger between Bryn Mawr and Haverford College was considered at one point.

== Background ==
=== Timeline ===
| Institution | Location | Present-day institution type | First admitted students | College chartered | Endowment (2021) billions USD |
|---|---|---|---|---|---|
| Mount Holyoke College | South Hadley, Massachusetts | Private women's liberal arts college | 1837 | 1888 | $1.07 |
| Vassar College | Poughkeepsie, New York | Private coeducational liberal arts college since 1969 | 1865 | 1861 | $1.38 |
| Wellesley College | Wellesley, Massachusetts | Private women's liberal arts college | 1875 | 1870 | $3.23 |
| Smith College | Northampton, Massachusetts | Private women's liberal arts college | 1875 | 1871 | $2.56 |
| Radcliffe College | Cambridge, Massachusetts | Dissolved following merger with Harvard College. Drawing on the legacy of Radcliffe College, the Harvard Radcliffe Institute, established in 1999, sustains a continuing commitment to the study of women, gender, and society. | 1879 | 1894 | (see Harvard) |
| Bryn Mawr College | Bryn Mawr, Pennsylvania | Private women's liberal arts college | 1885 | 1885 | $1.18 |
| Barnard College | Morningside Heights, Manhattan, New York | Private women's liberal arts college that is affiliated with Columbia University, but remains independent. | 1889 | 1889 | $0.46 |

=== History of the colleges and women's education ===
Irene Harwarth, Mindi Maline, and Elizabeth DeBra note that "independent nonprofit women's colleges, which included the 'Seven Sisters', were founded to provide educational opportunities to women equal to those available to men and were geared toward women who wanted to study the liberal arts". The colleges also offered broader opportunities in academia to women, hiring many female faculty members and administrators.

Early proponents of education for women were Sarah Pierce (Litchfield Female Academy, 1792); Catharine Beecher (Hartford Female Seminary, 1823); Zilpah P. Grant Banister (Ipswich Female Seminary, 1828); and Mary Lyon. Lyon was involved in the development of both Hartford Female Seminary and Ipswich Female Seminary. She was also involved in the creation of Wheaton Female Seminary (now Wheaton College, Massachusetts) in 1834. In 1837, Lyon founded Mount Holyoke Female Seminary (Mount Holyoke College). Mount Holyoke received its collegiate charter in 1888 and became Mount Holyoke Seminary and College. It became Mount Holyoke College in 1893. Vassar, however, was the first of the Seven Sisters to be chartered as a college in 1861.

Wellesley College was chartered in 1870 as the Wellesley Female Seminary, and was renamed Wellesley College in 1873. It opened to students in 1875. Smith College was chartered in 1871 and opened its doors in 1875. Bryn Mawr opened in 1885.

Radcliffe College grew out of the Women's Education Association of Boston, founded by a group of influential women, including Elizabeth Cary Agassiz, whose late husband was a Harvard scientist. Radcliffe College was founded in 1879 and chartered by the Commonwealth of Massachusetts in 1894. It was informally called The Harvard Annex because Harvard professors repeated the lectures they had given to male Harvard students there until 1943. By 1946, the majority of Harvard College courses were offered to both female Radcliffe students and male Harvard students. The schools further integrated in the 1960s, and in 1963 the first Harvard degrees were conferred on Radcliffe women. Despite having joint admissions, women's degrees continued to bear both Harvard and Radcliffe seals until 1999, when the merger of the two schools was completed. Since 1999, all undergraduate students have received diplomas bearing the seal of Harvard College and have been identified as Harvard students. Radcliffe College no longer exists as an undergraduate institution, but Radcliffe class reunions take place at Harvard each year. The Radcliffe Institute for Advanced Study was created following the merger in 1999 and offers non-degree instruction and executive education programs.

The relationship between Barnard College and Columbia University is governed by an intercorporate agreement that has been periodically updated and renewed since the two institutions first formally affiliated in 1900. The agreement outlines their connections and independence, notably that Barnard’s administration, endowment, operating budget, hiring of faculty and staff, and student enrollment is fully independent of Columbia. The Barnard Bulletin in 1976 described the relationship as "intricate and ambiguous". Barnard president Debora Spar said in 2012 that "the relationship is admittedly a complicated one, a unique one and one that may take a few sentences to explain to the outside community". Outside sources often describe Barnard as part of Columbia; The New York Times in 2013, for example, called Barnard "an undergraduate women's college of Columbia University". Barnard graduates receive Columbia University diplomas signed by both the Barnard and the Columbia presidents.

=== Coeducation ===
Radcliffe College and Vassar College are no longer women's colleges. Radcliffe merged completely into Harvard College in 1999 and no longer exists as a separate undergraduate institution. The component parts of its campus, the Radcliffe Quadrangle and Radcliffe Yard, retain the designation "Radcliffe" in perpetuity and serve or house both male and female students to this day. Vassar declined an offer to merge with Yale University and became independently coeducational in 1969, the same year that Yale did.

Barnard College was founded in 1889 as a women's college affiliated with Columbia University. However, it is independently governed, while making available to its students the instruction and the facilities of Columbia University. Columbia College, the university's largest liberal-arts undergraduate school, began admitting women in 1983 after a decade of failed negotiations with Barnard for a merger along the lines of the one between Harvard College and Radcliffe and between Brown and Pembroke. Barnard has an independent faculty (subject to Columbia University tenure approval) and board of trustees. Columbia University issues its diplomas, however, and most of Barnard's classes and activities are open to all members of Columbia University, male or female, and vice versa, in a reciprocal arrangement dating from 1900.

In 1969 Bryn Mawr and Haverford College (then all-male) developed a system of sharing residential colleges. When Haverford became coeducational in 1980, Bryn Mawr discussed the possibility of coeducation as well but decided against it.

As with Bryn Mawr, Mount Holyoke College, Smith College, and Wellesley College decided against adopting coeducation. Mount Holyoke engaged in a lengthy debate under the presidency of David Truman over the issue of coeducation. On November 6, 1971, "after reviewing an exhaustive study on coeducation, the board of trustees decided unanimously that Mount Holyoke should remain a women's college, and a group of faculty was charged with recommending curricular changes that would support the decision." Smith also made a similar decision in 1971. Two years later, Wellesley also announced that it would not adopt coeducation.

=== Transgender issues ===
Since the late 2000s, there has been discussion and controversy over how to accommodate transgender inclusion at the remaining women's colleges. This has risen to attention due to students that have in the course of their times at the colleges transitioned from women to other genders, and trans women applicants. Mount Holyoke became the first Seven Sisters college to accept transgender women in 2014. Barnard, Bryn Mawr, Smith, and Wellesley College announced trans-inclusive admissions policies in 2015.

== Gallery ==
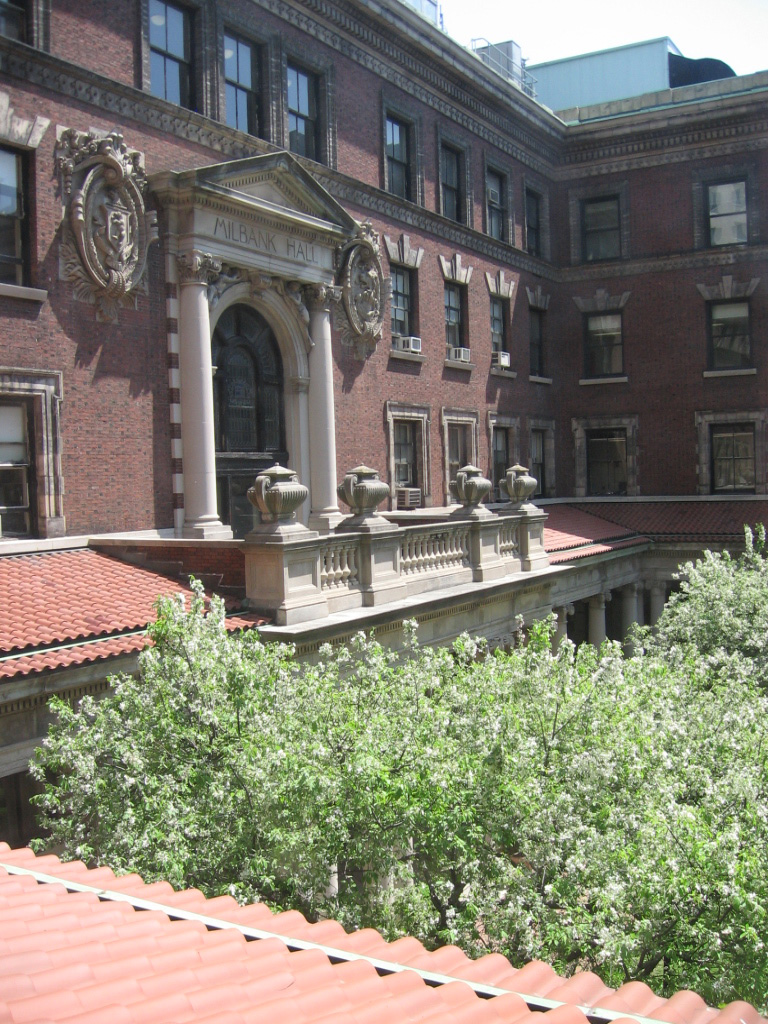
Barnard College's Milbank Hall

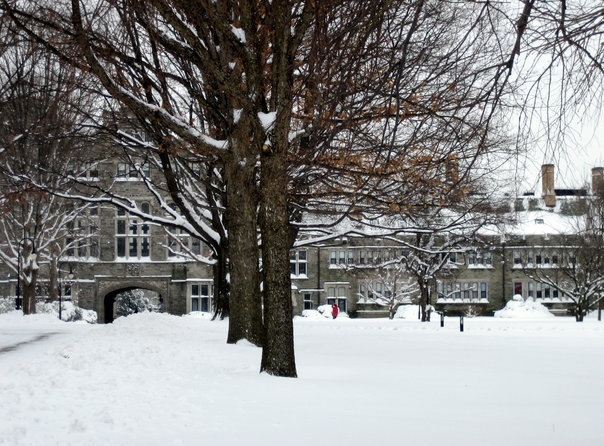
Bryn Mawr College's Pembroke Hall

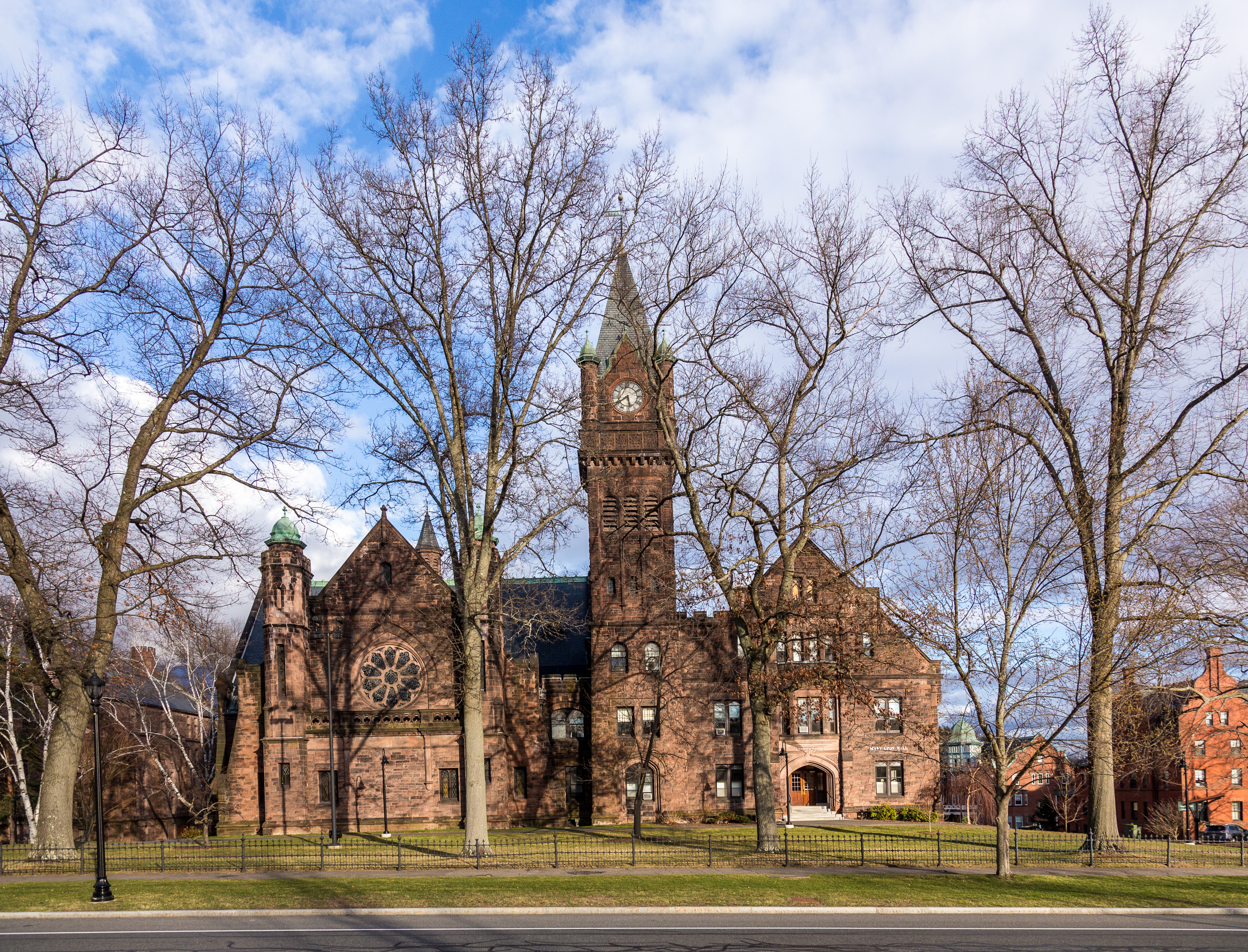
Mount Holyoke College's Mary Lyon Hall

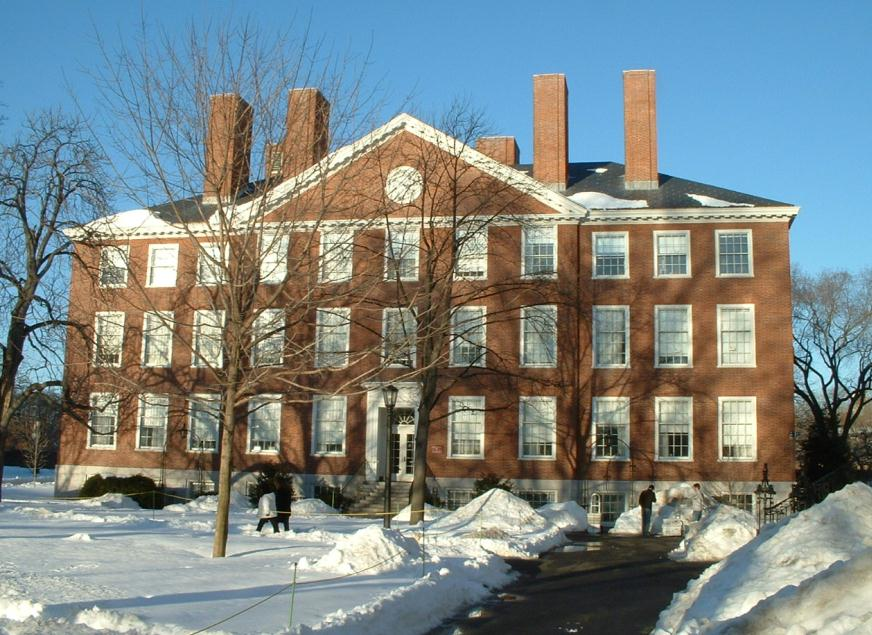
Radcliffe College's Byerly Hall

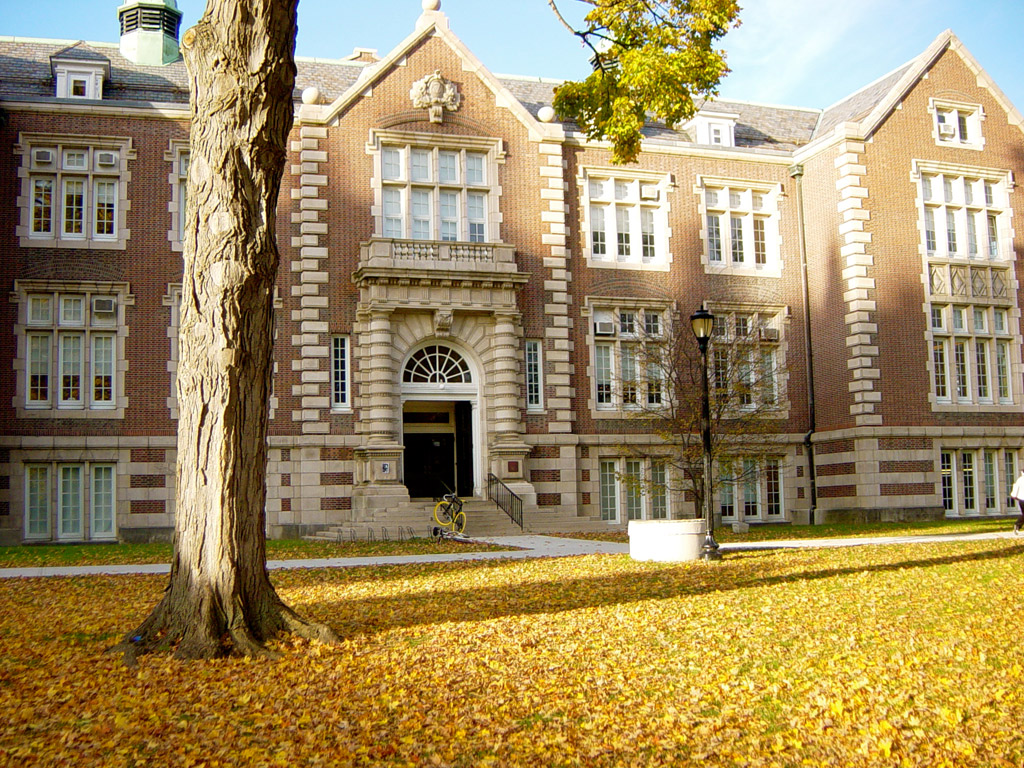
Vassar College's Rockefeller Hall

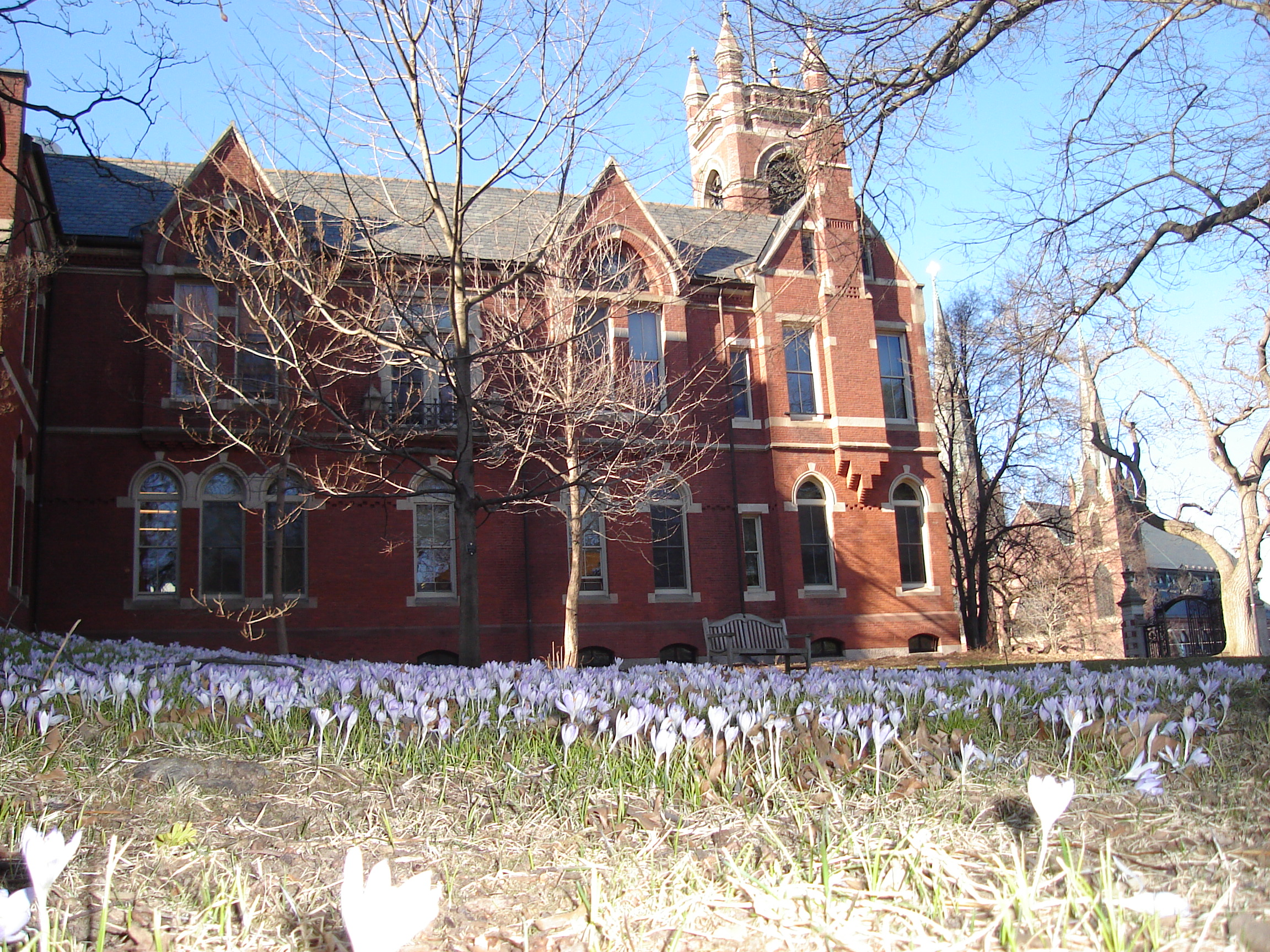
Smith College

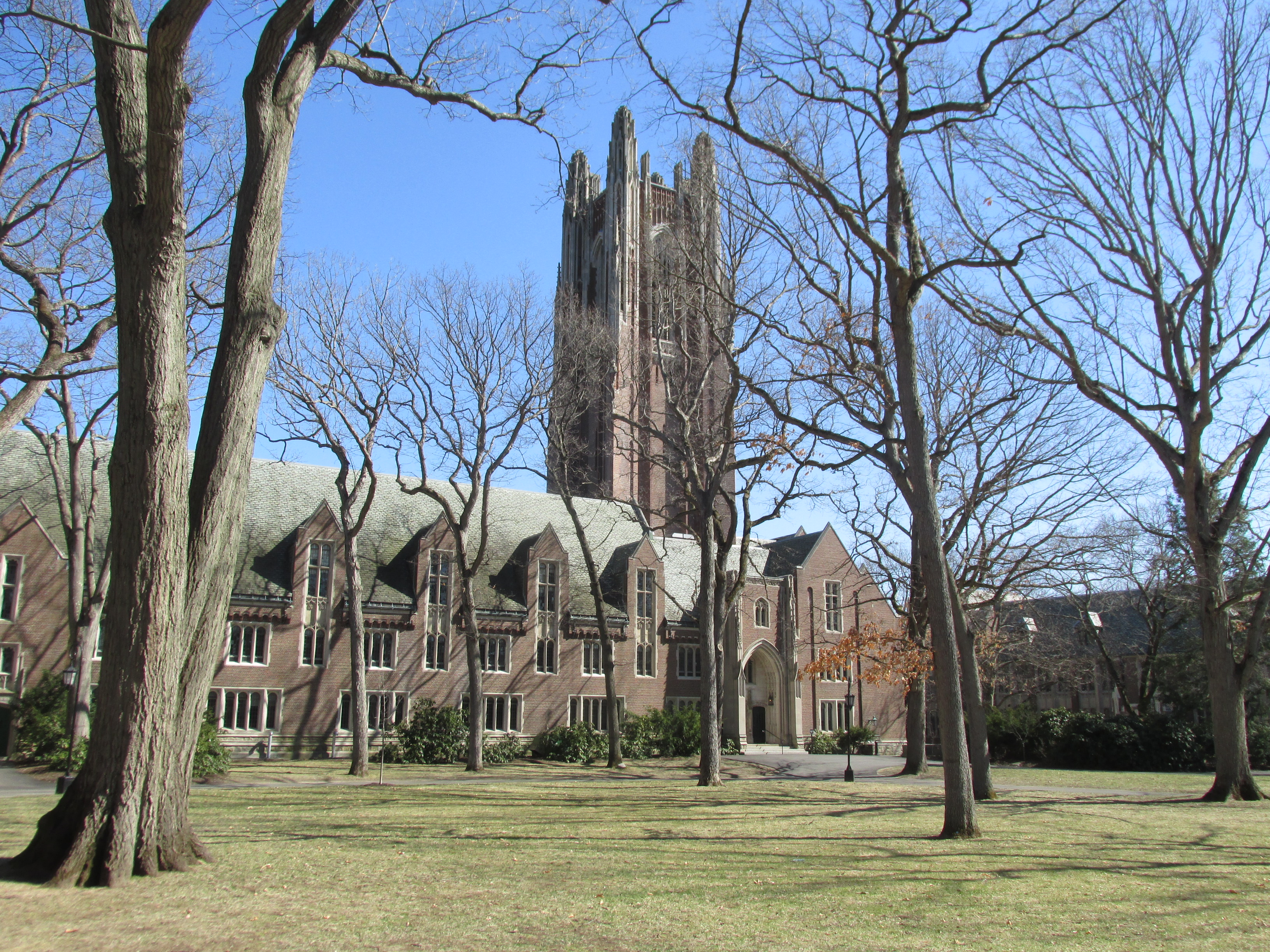
Green Hall at Wellesley College

== See also ==
- List of current and historical women's universities and colleges in the United States
- Timeline of women's colleges in the United States
- List of coordinate colleges
