= Maia =

One of the seven Pleiades sisters and the mother of Hermes from Greek mythology

- The Arcadian Pleiad Nymph
- Member of the Pleiades
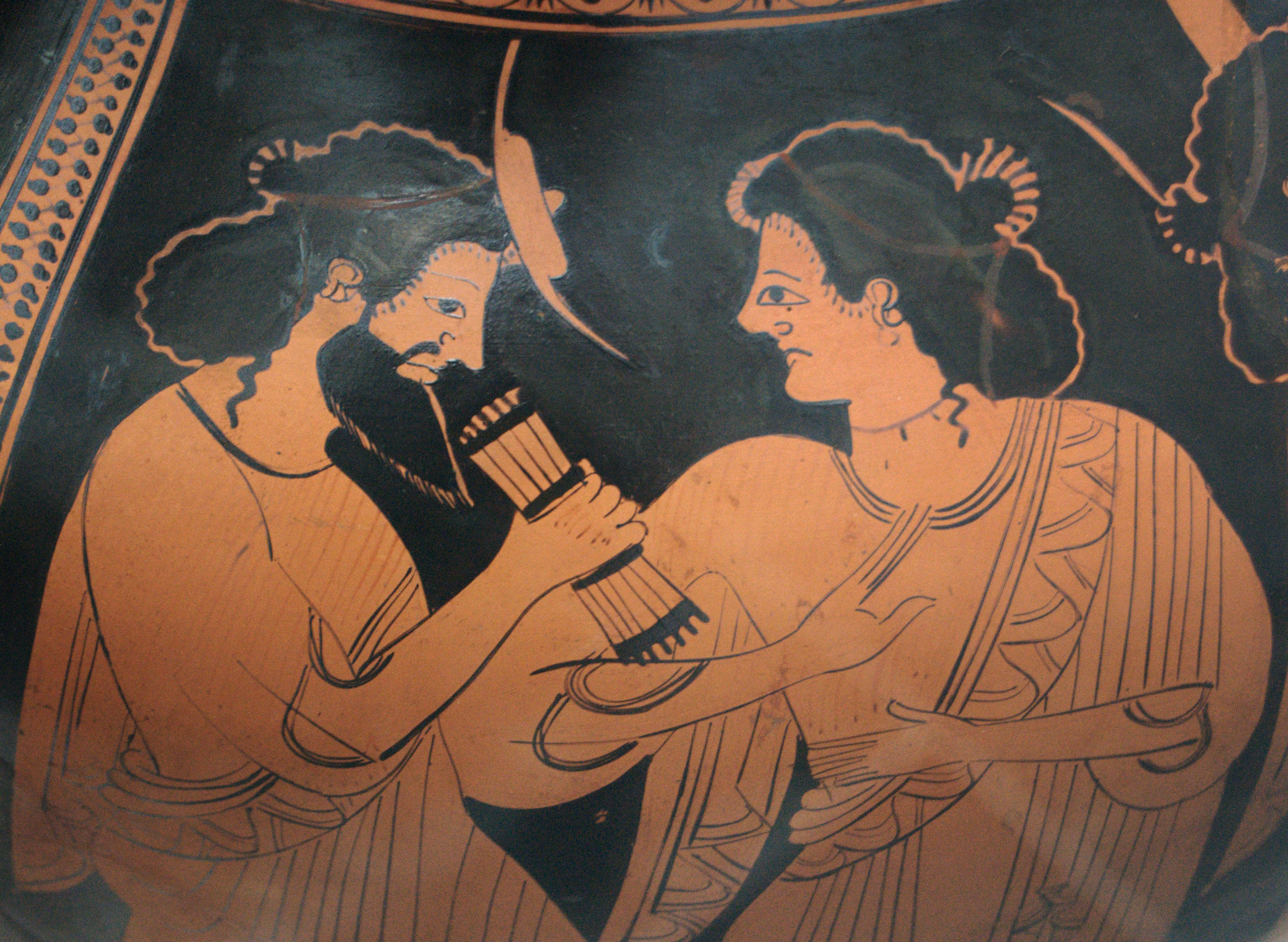
- Hermes and Maia, detail from an Attic red-figure amphora (c. 500 BC)
- Abode: Mount Cyllene, Arcadia

Genealogy
- Parents: Atlas and Pleione or Aethra
- Siblings: Pleiades: Electra; Taygete; Alcyone; Celaeno; Sterope; Merope; Hyades, Hyas
- Consort: Zeus
- Children: Hermes

Equivalents
- Roman: Maia

In ancient Greek mythology, Maia (Ancient Greek: Μαίη, lit. 'mother', 'nurse' or 'midwife'; pronounced /ˈmeɪ.ə/ or /ˈmaɪ.ə/), also spelled Maie, is one of the Pleiades and the mother of the messenger god Hermes by Zeus.

Maia was identified with the Roman earth goddess Maia, the mother of Mercury.

== Etymology ==
Her name is related to the word μαῖα (maîa), an honorific term for older women related to μήτηρ (mētēr, meaning mother), which also translates to "midwife" in Greek.

== Family ==
Maia is the daughter of Atlas and Pleione the Oceanid, and is the oldest of the seven Pleiades. They were born on Mount Cyllene in Arcadia, and are sometimes called mountain nymphs, oreads; Simonides of Ceos sang of "mountain Maia" (Maiados oureias) "of the lovely black eyes." Because they were daughters of Atlas, they were also called the Atlantides.

== Mythology ==
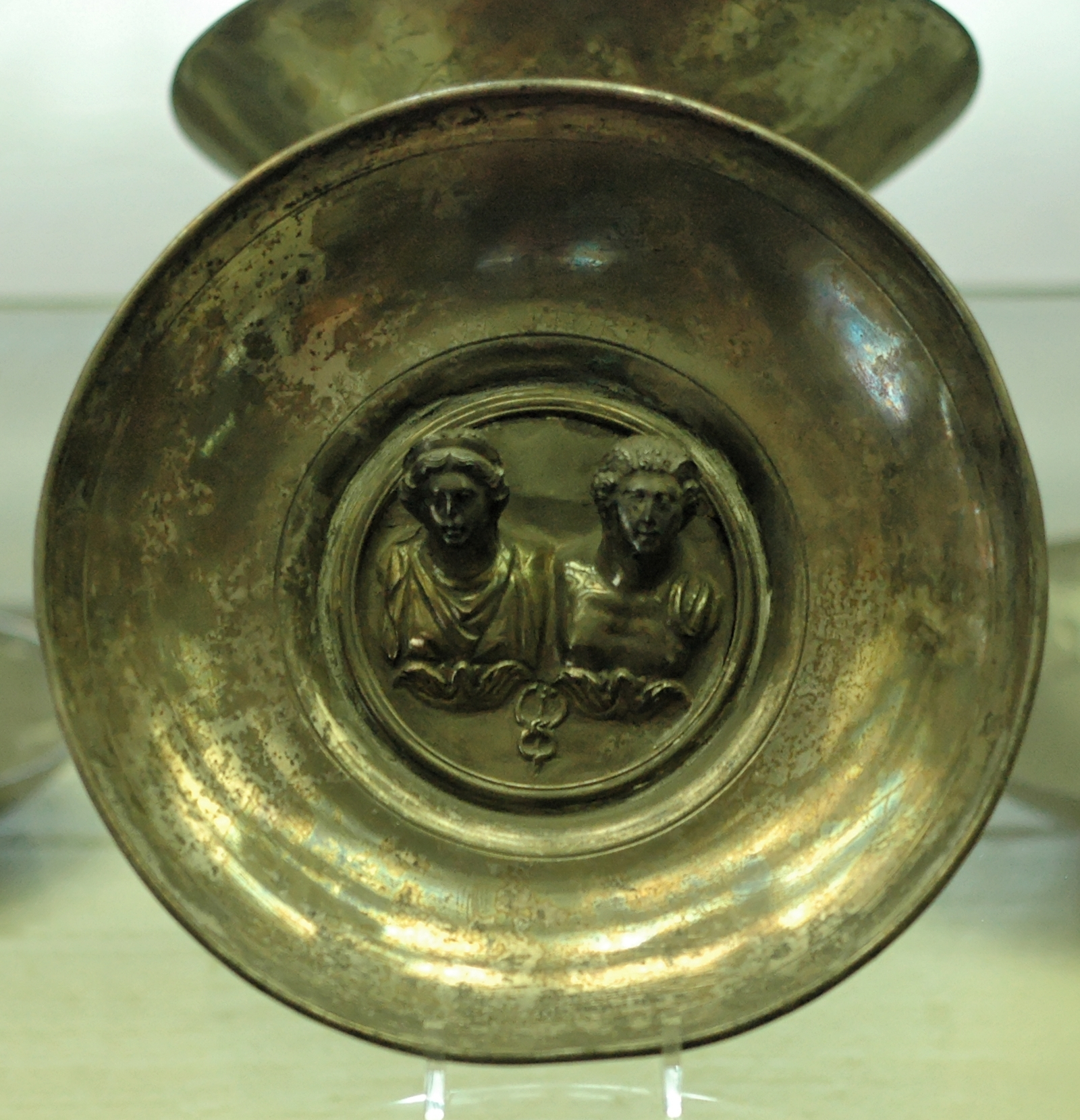
Mercury and Maia inside a silver cup dedicated by the freedman P. Aelius Eutychus (late 2nd century AD), from a Gallo-Roman religious site

=== Birth of Hermes ===
According to the Homeric Hymn to Hermes, Zeus, in the dead of night so that his wife Hera would not find out, secretly had sex with Maia, who avoided the company of the gods, in a cave of Cyllene. She became pregnant with Hermes. After giving birth to the baby, Maia wrapped him in blankets and went to sleep. The rapidly maturing infant Hermes crawled away to Thessaly, where, by nightfall of his first day, he stole some of his half-brother Apollo's cattle and invented the lyre from a tortoise shell. Maia refused to believe Apollo when he claimed that Hermes was the thief, and Zeus then sided with Apollo. Finally, Apollo exchanged the cattle for the lyre, which became one of his identifying attributes.

At another time, when Maia was bathing with her sisters the Pleiads, Hermes snuck in stealthily and stole all their clothes. When the nymphs finished their bath they looked around naked not knowing what to do while Hermes laughed, and then returned them their garments.

Although the Homeric Hymn has Maia as Hermes' caretaker and guardian, in Sophocles's now lost satyr play Ichneutae, Maia entrusted the infant Hermes to Cyllene (the local mountain goddess) to nurse and raise, and thus it is her that the satyrs and Apollo confront when looking for the god's missing cattle.

=== As nurturer ===
Maia also raised the infant Arcas, the child of Callisto with Zeus. Wronged by the love affair, Zeus' wife Hera in a jealous rage had transformed Callisto into a bear. Arcas is the eponym of Arcadia, where Maia was born. The story of Callisto and Arcas, like that of the Pleiades, is an aition for a stellar formation, the constellations Ursa Major and Ursa Minor, the Great and Little Bear.

== See also ==
- 66 Maja, asteroid
- Bona Dea
- Maia (star)
- Maiasaura
- Rosmerta
