= Aesyle (mythology) =

Greek mythological figure

In Greek mythology, Aesyle (Ancient Greek: Αἰσύλη, romanized: Aísýlē), also called Phaesyle (Ancient Greek: Φαισύλη, romanized: Phaisúlē or Phaisýlē, lit. 'shining' or 'filtered light' derived from phainô), was one of the three or five Hyades, sisters that were rain-bringing nymphs. She was the sister of Eudora and Ambrosia, Polyxo and Coronis, and Cleeia and Phaeo. They were called the daughters of the Titan Atlas by either the Oceanids Aethra or Pleione, or of Hyas and Boeotia.
