= 1051 Merope =

Large main-belt asteroid

Discovery
- Discovered by: K. Reinmuth
- Discovery site: Heidelberg Obs.
- Discovery date: 16 September 1925

Designations
- Pronunciation: /ˈmɛrəpiː/
- Named after: Μερόπη Meropē (Greek mythology)
- Alternative designations: 1925 SA · 1926 XA; 1931 TM_{3} · 1936 OG; A908 TE
- Minor planet category: main-belt · (outer); Alauda

Orbital characteristics
- Epoch 23 March 2018 (JD 2458200.5)
- Uncertainty parameter 0
- Observation arc: 92.19 yr (33,673 d)
- Aphelion: 3.5341 AU
- Perihelion: 2.8948 AU
- Semi-major axis: 3.2144 AU
- Eccentricity: 0.0994
- Orbital period (sidereal): 5.76 yr (2,105 d)
- Mean anomaly: 25.459°
- Mean motion: 0° 10^{m} 15.6^{s} / day
- Inclination: 23.507°
- Longitude of ascending node: 180.72°
- Argument of perihelion: 152.97°

Physical characteristics
- Mean diameter: 60.439±0.146 km 65.130±0.245 km 67.11 km (derived); 67.21±1.9 km 69.22±21.30 km 69.85±0.88 km 74.36±28.24 km
- Synodic rotation period: 13.717±0.0164 h 27.2±0.3 h
- Geometric albedo: 0.03±0.05; 0.0358 (derived); 0.040±0.001; 0.04±0.03; 0.0429±0.003; 0.0457±0.0058; 0.053±0.009
- Spectral type: P · C
- Absolute magnitude (H): 9.90 · 10.0; 10.05±0.40; 10.051±0.001 (R); 10.10 · 10.11

1051 Merope /ˈmɛrəpiː/ is a dark Alauda asteroid from the outermost region of the asteroid belt, approximately 68 kilometers (42 miles) in diameter. It was discovered on 16 September 1925, by German astronomer Karl Reinmuth at the Heidelberg-Königstuhl State Observatory in Heidelberg, Germany, and given the provisional designation 1925 SA. Reinmuth named it after the nymph Merope from Greek mythology. The asteroid has a rotation period of 27.2 hours.

== Orbit and classification ==
Merope is a member of the Alauda family (902), a large family of carbonaceous asteroids and named after its parent body, 702 Alauda.

It orbits the Sun in the outermost asteroid belt at a distance of 2.9–3.5 AU once every 5 years and 9 months (2,105 days; semi-major axis of 3.21 AU). Its orbit has an eccentricity of 0.10 and an inclination of 24° with respect to the ecliptic.

The asteroid was first observed as A908 TE at Taunton Observatory (803) in October 1908. The body's observation arc begins at Heidelberg in October 1925, or three weeks after its official discovery observation.

== Physical characteristics ==
Merope has been characterized as a primitive P-type asteroid by the Wide-field Infrared Survey Explorer (WISE), and as a common carbonaceous C-type asteroid by Pan-STARRS' photometric survey.

=== Rotation period ===
In March 2009, a rotational lightcurve of Merope was obtained from photometric observations by astronomers at the Oakley Southern Sky Observatory in Australia. Lightcurve analysis gave a rotation period of 27.2 hours with a brightness variation of 0.20 magnitude (U=2). In October 2012, astronomers at the Palomar Transient Factory in California measured a period 13.717 hours with an amplitude of 0.11 magnitude in the R-band (U=2), which seems to be an alternative period solution (1:2 alias) of what the Australian astronomers had previously measured. Previous observations by Gino Farroni and by Federico Manzini from 2004 and 2005, respectively, have been provisional and of poor quality (U=1/1).

=== Diameter and albedo ===
According to the surveys carried out by the Infrared Astronomical Satellite IRAS, the Japanese Akari satellite and the NEOWISE mission of NASA's WISE telescope, Merope measures between 60.439 and 74.36 kilometers in diameter and its surface has an albedo between 0.03 and 0.053.

The Collaborative Asteroid Lightcurve Link derives an albedo of 0.0358 and a diameter of 67.11 kilometers based on an absolute magnitude of 10.1.

== Naming ==
This minor planet was named after the nymph Merope from Greek mythology. She is one of the seven Pleiades, daughters of the Titan Atlas and the sea-nymph Pleione (AN229;297). The star Merope in the Pleiades star cluster is named for the same.
