= Merope (Pleiad) =

One of the seven Pleiades sisters from Greek mythology and wife of Sisyphus

- Pleiad Nymph
- Member of the Pleiades
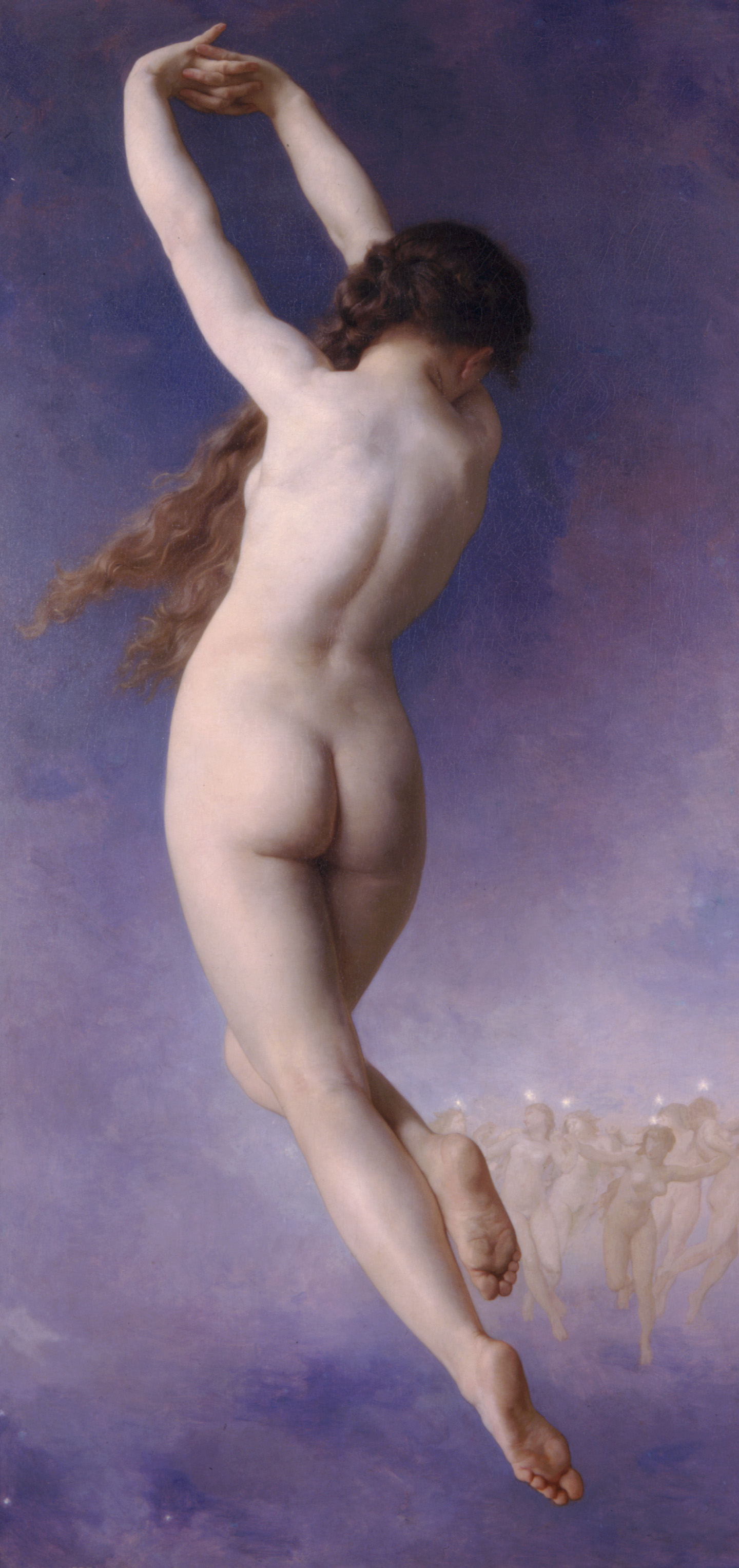
- L'Etoile Perdue (The Lost Star, 1884) by William-Adolphe Bouguereau: Merope with her sister Pleiades in the background
- Abode: Mt. Cyllene on Arcadia or later Corinth or Chios

Genealogy
- Parents: Atlas and Pleione
- Siblings: Pleiades, Hyades, Hyas
- Consort: Sisyphus
- Children: Glaucus, Ornytion (Porphyrion), Thersander and Almus

In Greek mythology, Merope (Ancient Greek: Μερόπη, romanized: Merópē, lit. 'with her face turned', derived from μέρος meros "part" and ὤψ ops "face, eye"; pronounced /ˈmɛrəpiː/, MEH-roh-pee) is one of the seven Pleiades, daughters of Atlas and Pleione. Their transformation into the star cluster known as the Pleiades is the subject of various myths.

== Mythology ==
=== Among the Pleiades ===
In one story, the Pleiades, along with their half sisters the Hyades, were virgin companions to Artemis. Artemis was the twin of Apollo and daughter of Leto and Zeus, and a protector of both hunters and wild animals. The Pleiades were nymphs, and along with their half sisters, were called Atlantides, Modonodes, or Nysiades and were the caretakers of the infant Bacchus.

Orion pursued the Pleiades named Maia, Electra, Taygete, Celaeno, Alcyone, Sterope, and Merope after he fell in love with their beauty and grace. Artemis asked Zeus to protect the Pleiades and in turn, Zeus turned them into stars. Artemis was angry because she no longer could see her companions and had her brother, Apollo, send a giant scorpion to chase and kill Orion. Zeus then turned Orion into a constellation to further pursue the Pleiades in the skies.

In another legend, the sisters were transformed by Zeus into stars because Orion fell in love with them and relentlessly pursued their affection for 12 years. At first they were turned into doves, but later, along with Orion, into stars so that forever the hunter Orion would pursue them.

In either legend the Pleiades were turned into stars and now, along with their half sisters, the Hyades (who died weeping for their dead brother Hyas), are part of the star constellation Taurus.

=== Marriage ===
Only six stars of the Pleiades are easily visible to the naked eye. Merope was said to be the faintest of the stars, the "lost Pleiad", because she was the only one of the Pleiades to have married a mortal. Her sisters had relations with gods and bore them sons, but Merope married Sisyphus and lived on the island Chios. Merope gave birth to Ornytion (Porphyrion), Glaucus, Thersander and Almus. One myth says that she hid her face in shame because she had an affair with a mortal man. Astronomers did not follow this myth when the stars of the Pleiades were named in the 17th century; the faintest of the named stars is Asterope rather than Merope.

== In art ==
The several 18th and 19th century dramas and operas titled Merope deal with a completely different myth. There have been, however, artistic depictions of the stellar Pleiad:

The Lost Pleiade (1874/75), a marble sculpture by Randolph Rogers, was inspired by Ovid's Latin poem Fasti, which recounts the legend of the seven sisters. The statue, which shows her rising from a cloud in search of her lost siblings, is on display in the Art Institute of Chicago.

L'etoile perdue (The Lost Star, 1884) by William-Adolphe Bouguereau depicts the separated Merope from behind with her sister Pleiades as faint images in the background (see above). The title has also been rendered as "The Lost Pleiad".
