= 66 Maja =

Main-belt asteroid

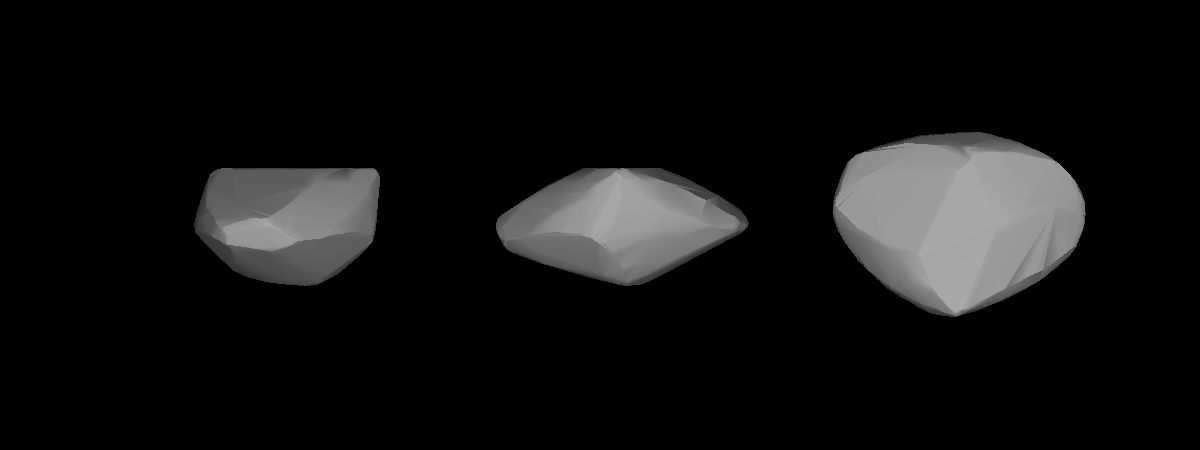
- Lightcurve-based 3D-model of Maja

Discovery
- Discovered by: H. P. Tuttle
- Discovery site: Harvard College Obs.
- Discovery date: 9 April 1861

Designations
- Pronunciation: /ˈmeɪ.ə/
- Named after: Maia (Greek mythology)
- Alternative designations: 1947 FO · 1974 KR; 1992 OX_{10} · A902 UF; A906 QD
- Minor planet category: main-belt · (middle) background
- Adjectives: Majan

Orbital characteristics
- Epoch 4 September 2017 (JD 2458000.5)
- Uncertainty parameter 0
- Observation arc: 156.54 yr (57,178 days)
- Aphelion: 3.1021 AU
- Perihelion: 2.1884 AU
- Semi-major axis: 2.6453 AU
- Eccentricity: 0.1727
- Orbital period (sidereal): 4.30 yr (1,571 days)
- Mean anomaly: 241.56°
- Mean motion: 0° 13^{m} 44.76^{s} / day
- Inclination: 3.0461°
- Longitude of ascending node: 7.5071°
- Argument of perihelion: 44.071°

Physical characteristics
- Mean diameter: 62.87±15.72 km 62.901±19.42 km 71.79±0.92 km 71.82±5.3 km 74.30±21.31 km 82.28±2.11 km
- Mass: (3.00±0.75)×10^{17} kg (Note: Calculated from its standard gravitational parameter GM = 0.020±0.005 km^{3}/s^{2}.)
- Mean density: 1.57 g/cm^{3} (Note: Assuming a diameter of 71.8 km.)
- Synodic rotation period: 9.733 h 9.73509±0.00005 h 9.73570±0.00005 h 9.736±0.009 h 9.74±0.05 h 9.761±0.03 h
- Geometric albedo: 0.03±0.01; 0.037±0.052; 0.05±0.02; 0.0618±0.010; 0.062±0.002; 0.0759±0.0615
- Spectral type: Tholen = C · C SMASS = Ch; B–V = 0.697; U–B = 0.360; V–R = 0.374±0.010
- Absolute magnitude (H): 9.18 · 9.18±0.35 · 9.36 · 9.44±0.09 · 9.48 · 9.84

66 Maja (/ˈmeɪə/) is a carbonaceous background asteroid from the central regions of the asteroid belt, approximately 71 kilometers in diameter. It was discovered on 9 April 1861, by American astronomer Horace Tuttle at the Harvard College Observatory in Cambridge, Massachusetts, United States. The asteroid was named after Maia from Greek mythology.

== Orbit and classification ==
Maja is a non-family asteroid from the main belt's background population. It orbits the Sun in the central asteroid belt at a distance of 2.2–3.1 AU once every 4 years and 4 months (1,571 days; semi-major axis of 2.65 AU). Its orbit has an eccentricity of 0.17 and an inclination of 3° with respect to the ecliptic. The body's observation arc begins at the Harvard Observatory, one night after its official discovery observation.

== Physical characteristics ==
In the Tholen classification, Maja is a carbonaceous C-type asteroid, while in the SMASS classification it is a "hydrated" carbonaceous subtype (Ch).

=== Rotation period and spin axes ===
Several rotational lightcurves of Maja have been obtained from photometric observations since 1988. Analysis of the best-rated lightcurve by French amateur astronomers Maurice Audejean and Jérôme Caron from February 2011 gave a rotation period of 9.73509 hours with a brightness amplitude of 0.25 magnitude (U=3).

In 2016, a modeled lightcurve was derived from various photometric database sources, giving a concurring sidereal period of 9.73570 hours and two spin axes of (49.0°, −70.0°) and (225.0°, −68.0°) in ecliptic coordinates.

=== Diameter and albedo ===
According to the surveys carried out by the Infrared Astronomical Satellite IRAS, the Japanese Akari satellite and the NEOWISE mission of NASA's Wide-field Infrared Survey Explorer, Maja measures between 62.87 and 82.28 kilometers in diameter and its surface has an albedo between 0.03 and 0.0759.

The Collaborative Asteroid Lightcurve Link adopts the results obtained by IRAS, that is, an albedo of 0.0618 and a diameter of 71.82 kilometers based on an absolute magnitude of 9.36.

== Naming ==
This minor planet was named by Harvard's former president, J. Quincy, after Maia, one of the Seven Sisters of the Pleiades in Greek mythology. She is the mother of Hermes (Mercury) and the daughter of Atlas and Pleione. The official naming citation was mentioned in The Names of the Minor Planets by Paul Herget in 1955 (H 10).

The asteroids 130 Elektra, 233 Asterope and 1051 Merope were also named after the mythological Seven Sisters. In 1861, the director of the discovering observatory, George Phillips Bond, raised a minor concern since these names had already been applied to some of the brightest stars of the Pleiades in the constellation of Taurus: Maia, Electra, Asterope and Merope.

== Spacecraft visits ==
At present, Maja has not been visited by any spacecraft. As of 1988, mission planning for the Cassini–Huygens spacecraft included a flyby of Maja while leaving the inner solar system in March 1997, however due to delays, the launch of Cassini-Huygens was moved from April 1996 to October 1997, thus negating the option to pass near Maja. Cassini-Huygens passed by asteroid 2685 Masursky on 23 January 2000 instead.
