= Sister school =

Pair of schools, usually single-sex school

A sister school is usually a pair of schools, usually single-sex schools, one with female students and the other with male students. This relationship is seen to benefit both schools. For instance, when Harvard University was a male-only school, Radcliffe College was its sister school. The sister school concept as a single-sex school began to change as several institutions adopted coeducational environments starting in the 1970s due to the increasing awareness or consciousness about sex bias and discrimination.

== Background ==
The term sister school (or brother school) has several alternate meanings:

- a definite financial commerce between two colleges or universities
- two schools that have a strong historical connection
- two schools which have social activities involving students from both schools
- two schools under the same management
- two schools built using the same floor plan/layout
- two schools in different nations that have established a collaborative international partnership.

== Examples of Sister Schools (United States) ==
- The Seven Sisters (colleges) are a group of originally seven (now five) private liberal arts colleges that are in the Northeastern United States. The majority of them were chartered between the 1860s-1880s.
- Saint Mary's College (Indiana) is the sister school of the University of Notre Dame. Both schools are located in Notre Dame, Indiana. The schools have had a partnership for over 170 years.
