= Porphyrion (mythology) =

In Greek mythology, Porphyrion (Ancient Greek: Πορφυρίων, romanized: Porphyríōn or Porphyriôn, lit. 'surging', 'gleaming darkly' or 'purple') may refer to the following characters:

- Porphyrion, one of the Giants, offspring of Gaea, born from the blood that fell when Uranus (Sky) was castrated by their son Cronus.
- Porphyrion, an earlier Athenian king than Actaeus. He was the reputed founder of the sanctuary of Heavenly Aphrodite on Athmoneis, an Attican deme.
- Porphyrion, also known as Ornytion, a King of Corinth after succeeding his father, Sisyphus, the great trickster. His mother was the Pleiad Merope, daughter of the Titan Atlas, and brother to Glaucus, Thersander and Almus.
- Porphyrion, son of Celeus and one of the Athenian sacrificial victims for the Minotaur. He may be the brother of Hesione, another sacrificial victim granting that their father is only one and the same.
