= Thersander =

Greek mythological figures with same name

In Greek mythology, the name Thersander (/θɜːrˈsændər, -ˈsɑːn-/; Ancient Greek: Θέρσανδρος Thersandros means 'bold man' derived from θέρσος thersos 'boldness, braveness' and ανδρος andros 'of a man') refers to several distinct characters:

- Thersander or Thersandrus, a Corinthian prince as the son of King Sisyphus and the Pleiad Merope, daughter of the Titan Atlas. He was the brother of Ornytion (Porphyrion), Glaucus and Almus. His sons were Haliartus and Coronus, eponyms of Haliartus and Coronea, respectively, and also Proetus, himself the father of Maera who was known to have died a maiden.
- Thersander, one of the Heraclidae, son of Agamedidas.He was a king of the Cleonaeans and his twin daughters Anaxandra and Lathria married the twin sons of Aristodemus, Procles and Eurysthenes.
- Thersander of Crete, father, by Arethusa, of a son Hyllus (not to be confused with the son of Heracles). Hyllus was killed by Aeneas in the Trojan War.
- Thersander, son of Polynices and one of the Epigoni, killed by Telephus.
