= Ascus (mythology) =

Giant in Ancient Greek mythology

Ascus (Ancient Greek: Ἄσκος) was a giant from ancient Greek mythology, who in conjunction with Lycurgus of Thrace chained the god Dionysus and threw him into a river. The god Hermes (or, according to other tellings, Zeus) rescued Dionysus, conquered (ἐδαμασεν) the giant, flayed him, and made a bag (ἄσκος) of his skin.

A folk etymology once said that the town of Damascus in Syria derived its name from this event, though the name of that city dates back to at least the 15th century BCE.
