= Lycus (son of Poseidon) =

Son of Poseidon in Greek mythology

In Greek mythology, Lycus (/ˈlaɪkəs/ LY-kəs; Ancient Greek: Λύκος, romanized: Lúkos, lit. 'wolf'), also called Lycaon, was a son of Poseidon and Celaeno, one of the Pleiades. He was settled in the Fortunate Isles by his father.
