= Seven-dots glyph =

Ancient glyphs found in Turkey

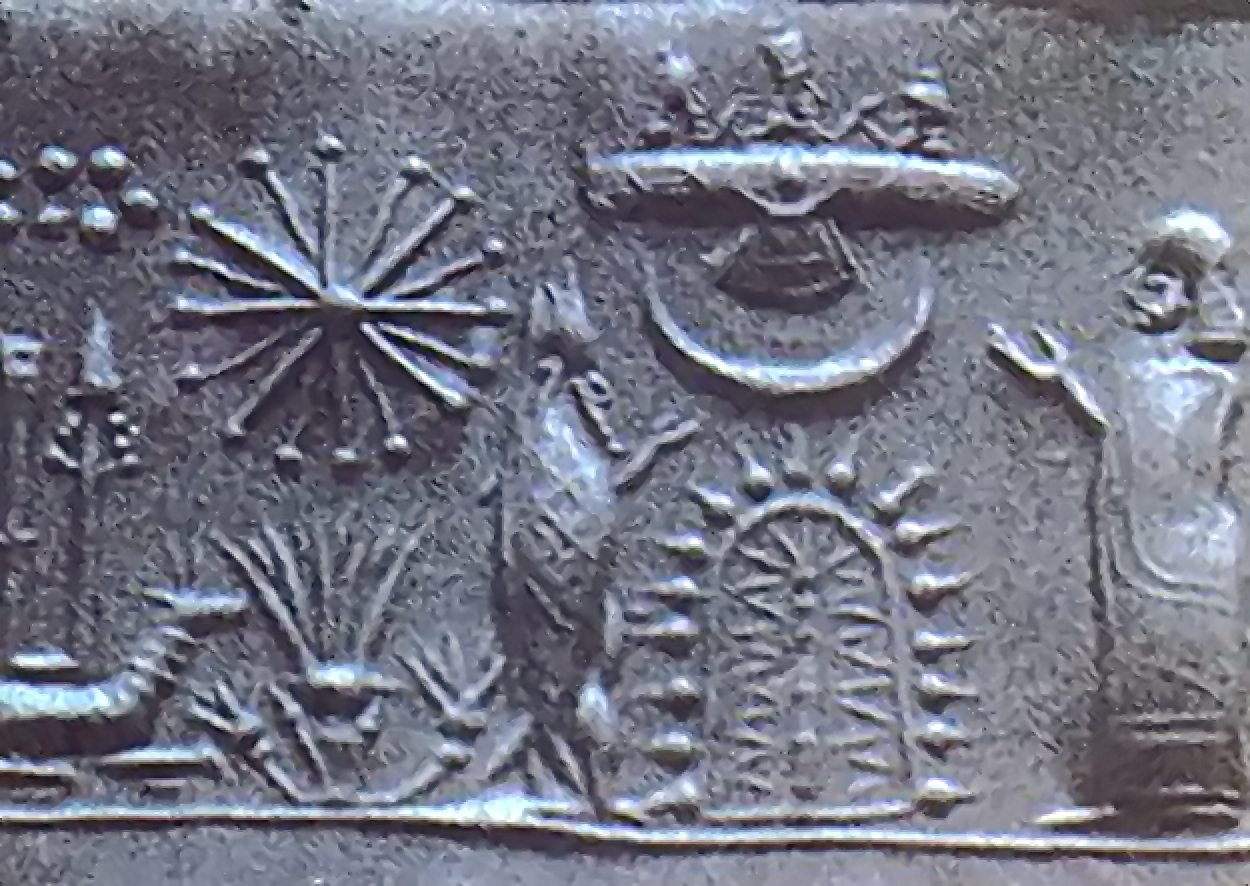
A Sumerian cylinder seal impression showing the Assyrian Tree of life, the 7-dots glyph (in this case the Pleiades), etc.

The 7-dot glyphs (or globes) are first known in Mittanian art (Turkey, or ancient Anatolia), but is possibly older. It appears in the iconography of cylinder seals, and later on reliefs, or other motifs. With origins on cylinder seals, its meanings may come from paleohistory back to the 4th millennium BC, or even further into the 6th to 5th millennium with the origins of Europe, or Turkey's Çatal Hüyük.

The 7-dot glyph was at first six dots surrounding a central dot; later two rows of 3-dots ended with a 7th as the finial.

== Later iconography of seven gods ==
Originally the seven dots probably related to the Sumerian Sebitti. Later gods included Seven (gods), the Seven, possibly referencing the Elamite god Narudu.

For '7' being the first prime number after '5' (easily represented by the 5-fingered human hand, with šu–., as the cuneiform for the "hand"), and later associated with the Seven Sisters, or sometimes the constellation Pleiades, it became iconographic.

In ancient Egypt, the idea of '7' was associated with a person's birth. At birth, the Seven Hathors determined the fates in an individual's life.

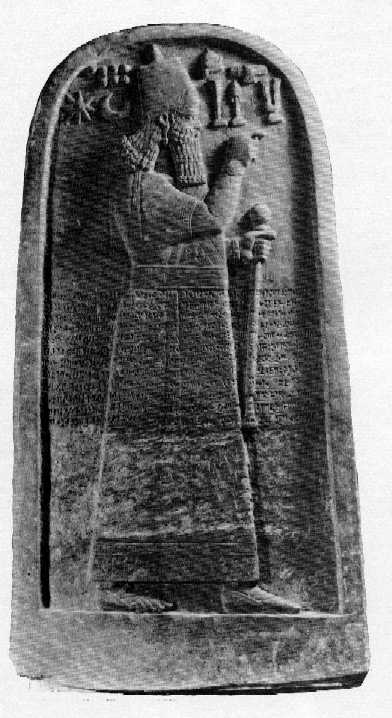

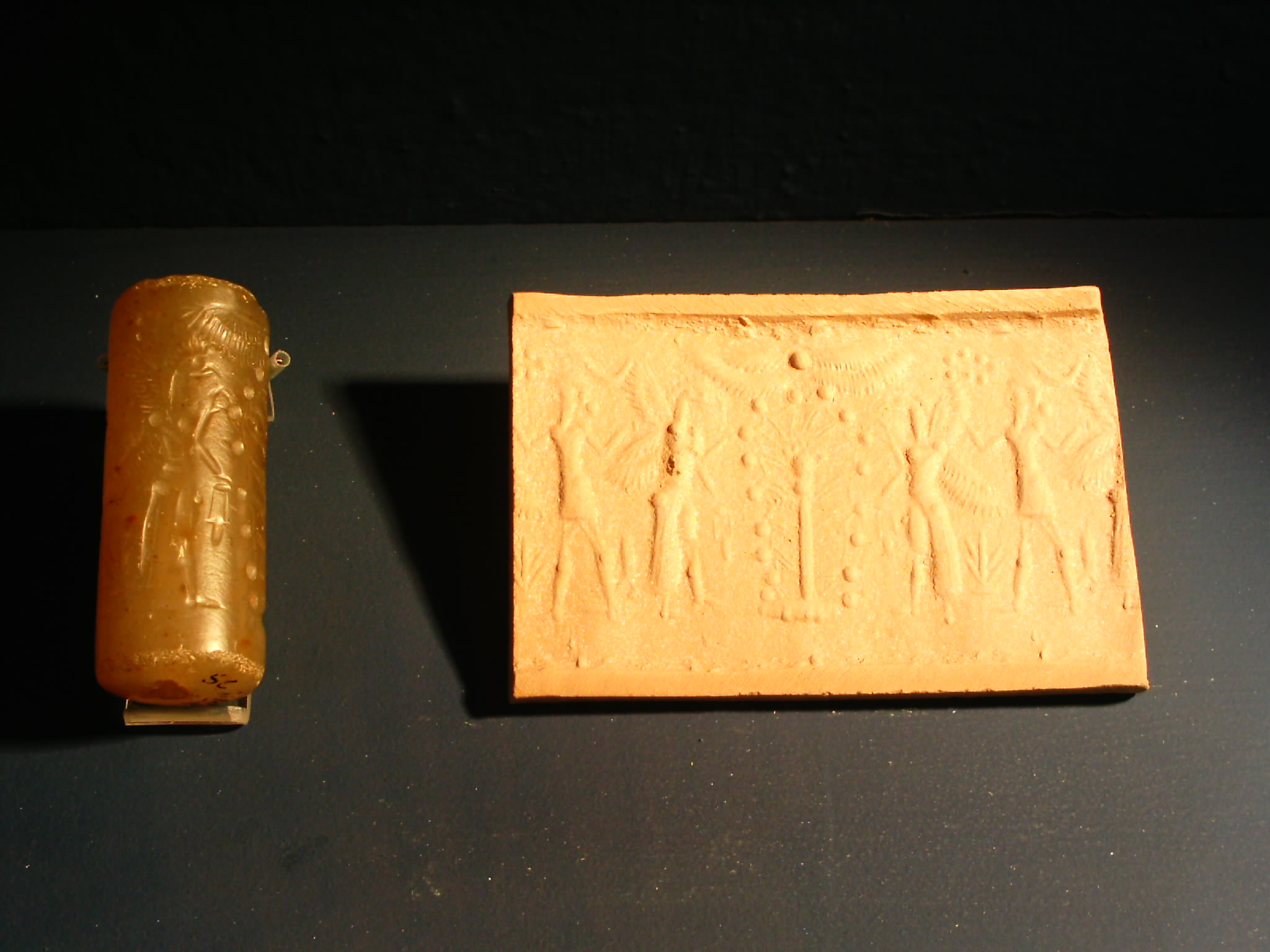

== See also ==
- Seven Lucky Gods
- Sebitti
