= Ambrosia (Hyades) =

In Greek mythology, one of the three or five Hyades

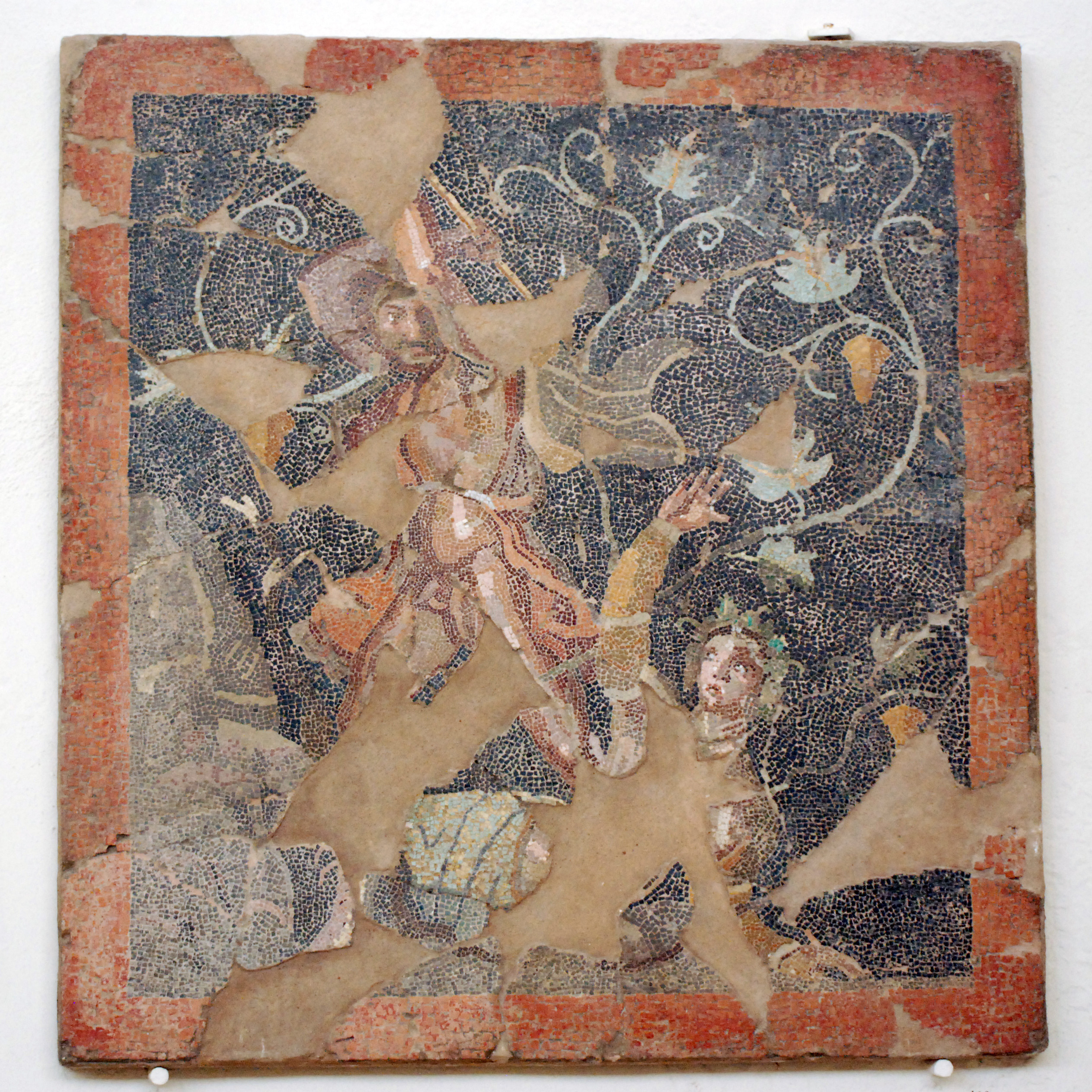
Lycurgus about to hit Ambrosia who transform into a vine, Greek mosaic from Delos, late second century BC.

In Greek mythology, Ambrosia (/amˈbrəʊzɪə/; Ancient Greek: Ἀμβροσία, lit. 'immortal' or 'divine') was one of the Hyades.

== Mythology ==
Dionysus was entrusted as a child to Ambrosia and her sisters, the Hyades. Later, Lycurgus assaulted the child Dionysus who was crossing his lands on Mount Nysa, escorted by the hyades. Lycurgus pursued and killed Ambrosia during this assault while her other sisters escaped and took refuge with Thetis. As she died, she turned into a vine, trapping the murderer in her branches until the god returned.

According to another version, Ambrosia was one of the fifteen daughters of Atlas and Pleione and one of five sisters (the Hyades, in Latin Sicule). At the death of their only brother, Hyas, killed by a lion (or a boar), they cried so much that, according to myths, they either turned into stars or were transformed by the moved gods, thus becoming the constellation Hyades while their brother Hyas was transformed into the constellation Aquarius.

== See also ==
- Hyades
- Lycurgus
