= Lycurgus (son of Dryas) =

Mythological king of the Edoni in Thrace

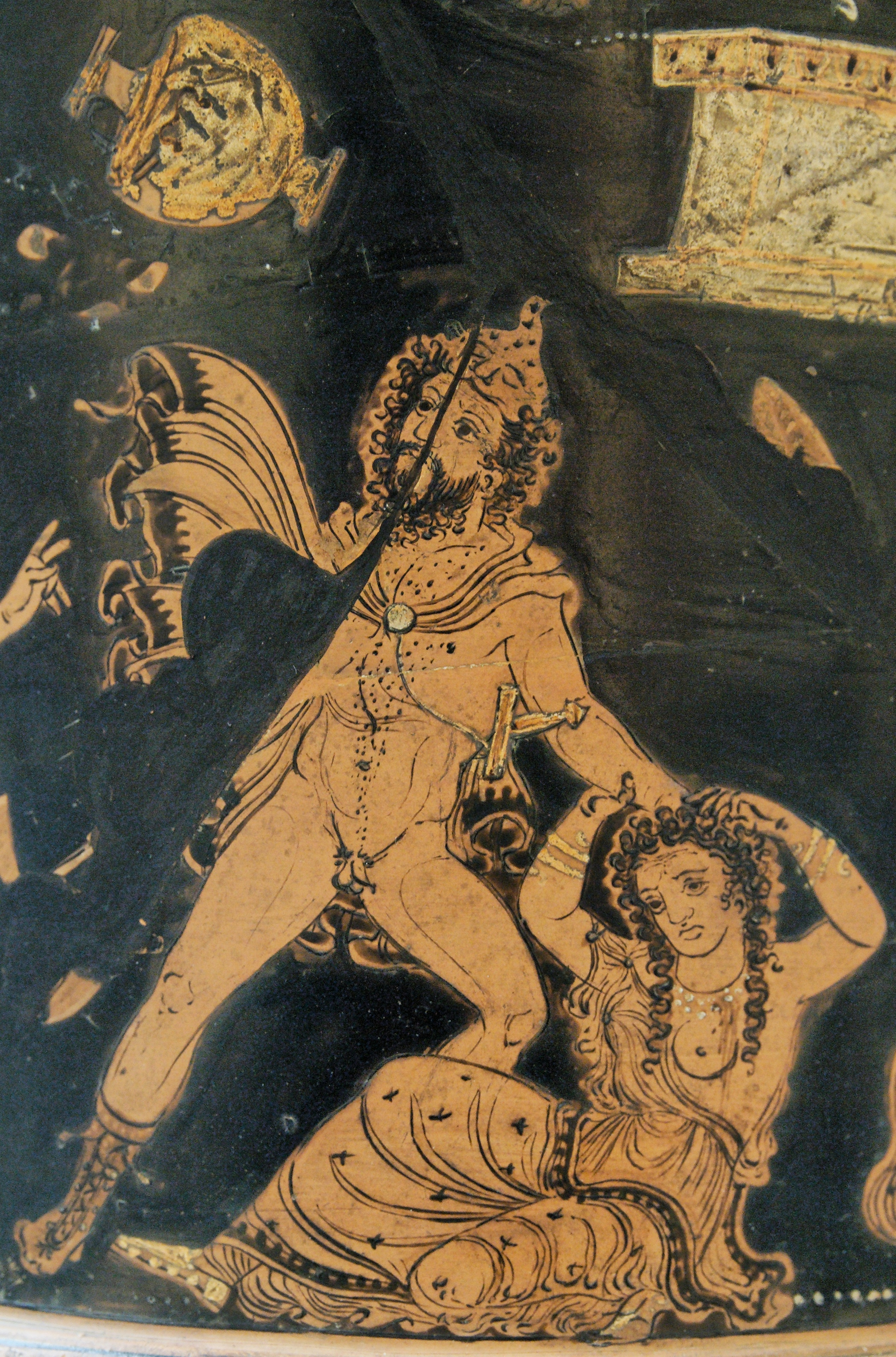
Lycurgus, driven mad by Dionysus, attacks his wife. Name-piece of the Lycurgus Painter, 350–340 BC. British Museum.

In Greek mythology, Lycurgus (/laɪˈkɜːrɡəs/), Ancient Greek: Λυκοῦργος, romanized: Lykoûrgos, lit. 'wolf-work', 'tamer of wolves', or 'defender' /ly.kûːr.ɡos/) was the king of the Edoni in Thrace, son of Dryas, the "oak", and father of a son whose name was also Dryas.

== Mythology ==
Lycurgus banned the cult of Dionysus. When Lycurgus heard that Dionysus was in his kingdom, he imprisoned Dionysus's followers, the Maenads, or "chased the[m] through the holy hills of Nysa, and the sacred implements dropped to the ground from the hands of one and all, as [he] struck them down with his ox-goad".

The compiler of Bibliotheke (3.5.1) says that as punishment, especially for his treatment for Ambrosia, Dionysus' nursemaid; the god drove Lycurgus insane. In his madness, Lycurgus mistook his son for a mature trunk of ivy, which is holy to Dionysus, and killed him, pruning away his nose and ears, fingers and toes. Consequently, the land of Thrace dried up in horror. Dionysus decreed that the land would stay dry and barren as long as Lycurgus was left unpunished for his injustice, so his people bound him and flung him to man-eating horses on Mount Pangaeüs. However, another version of the tale, transmitted in Servius's commentary on Aeneid 3.14, Porphyrio's commentary on Horace's Ode 2.19, and Hyginus in his Fabulae 132, records that Lycurgus cut off his own foot when he meant to cut down a vine of ivy. With Lycurgus dead, Dionysus lifted the curse. Also according to Hyginus, Lycurgus tried to rape his mother after imbibing wine. When he discovered what he had done, he attempted to cut down the grapevines, believing the wine to be a bad medicine. Dionysus drove him mad as a punishment, causing him to kill both his wife and his son, and threw him to the panthers on Mount Rhodope.

Diodorus Siculus relates that, centuries before the Trojan war, King Lycurgus of Thrace exiled one of his commanders, Mopsus, along with Sipylus the Scythian. Sometime later, when the Libyan Amazons invaded Thrace, Mopsus and Sipylus came to the rescue by defeating them in a pitched battle, in which their queen Myrine was slain; the Thracians then pursued the surviving Amazons all the way to Libya.

In some versions the story of Lycurgus and his punishment by Dionysus is placed in Arabia rather than in Thrace. The tragedian Aeschylus, in a lost play, depicted Lycurgus as a beer-drinker and hence a natural opponent of the wine god. There is a further reference to Lycurgus in Sophocles' Antigone in the Chorus's ode after Antigone is taken away (960 in the Greek text).

In Homer's Iliad, an older source than Aeschylus, Lycurgus's punishment for his disrespect towards the gods, particularly Dionysus, is blindness inflicted by Zeus followed not long after by death.

According to Sophocles, the frenzied Lycurgus mocked at Dionysus and as punishment was shut in "a prison of stone" until his madness went away.

The author of the Geoponica states that Dionysus, fleeing from Lycurgus, tied him up with vines and dove into the sea; Lycurgus shed a tear then, which transformed into cabbage. This was supposedly why grapevines and cabbages had a mutual dislike toward one another, and could not thrive together, as vines withered in the fields whenever a cabbage was growing nearby.

== See also ==
- Lycurgus Cup
- Sithon

== Sources ==
- Dalby, Andrew (2005). The Story of Bacchus. London: British Museum Press. ISBN 0-7141-2255-6.
- Anonymous (1805). Geoponika: Agricultural Pursuits. Vol. II. Translated by Thomas Owen. London.
- Ascherson, Ferdinand (1884). Berliner Studien für classische Philologie und Archaeologie. Calvary.
