= 322 Phaeo =

Main-belt asteroid

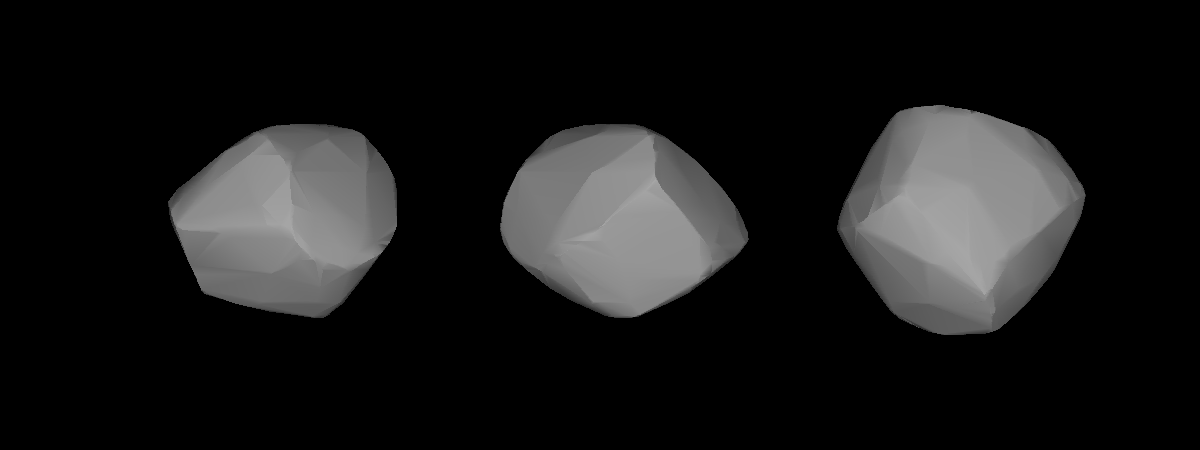
- Lightcurve-based 3D model of 322 Phaeo

Discovery
- Discovered by: A. Borrelly
- Discovery site: Marseille Obs.
- Discovery date: 27 November 1891

Designations
- Pronunciation: /ˈfiːoʊ/
- Named after: Φαιώ Phaiō (Greek mythology)
- Minor planet category: main-belt · (middle); Phaeo
- Adjectives: Phaeoian /fiːˈoʊ.iən/

Orbital characteristics
- Epoch 23 March 2018 (JD 2458200.5)
- Uncertainty parameter 0
- Observation arc: 126.48 yr (46,198 d)
- Aphelion: 3.4656 AU
- Perihelion: 2.0960 AU
- Semi-major axis: 2.7808 AU
- Eccentricity: 0.2463
- Orbital period (sidereal): 4.64 yr (1,694 d)
- Mean anomaly: 110.49°
- Mean motion: 0° 12^{m} 45^{s} / day
- Inclination: 8.0544°
- Longitude of ascending node: 252.36°
- Argument of perihelion: 115.00°

Physical characteristics
- Mean diameter: 71.88 ± 4.32 km (composite estimate); 69.855±0.320 km
- Mass: (6.0±6.0)×10^{17} kg (Note: Calculated from its standard gravitational parameter GM = 0.04±0.04 km^{3}/s^{2}.) (SB441)
- Mean density: 3.1–3.4 g/cm^{3} (calculated)
- Synodic rotation period: 17.5845±0.0001 h
- Geometric albedo: 0.089±0.014
- Spectral type: Tholen = X SMASS = X B–V = 0.719; U–B = 0.230
- Absolute magnitude (H): 9.01

322 Phaeo is an asteroid from the central regions of the asteroid belt, approximately 70 kilometers (43 miles) in diameter. It was discovered on 27 November 1891, by French astronomer Alphonse Borrelly at the Marseille Observatory in southern France. The presumably metallic X-type asteroid is the principal body of the Phaeo family and has a rotation period of 17.6 hours. It was named for the Greek mythological figure Phaeo, one of the Hyades or nymphs. Several other asteroids were named for other of the Hyades – 193 Ambrosia, 158 Koronis, 217 Eudora, and 308 Polyxo.
