= Dione (mythology) =

Women from Greek mythology

Dione (/daɪˈoʊniː/; Ancient Greek: Διώνη, romanized: Diṓnē, the feminine form of Zeus, which in the genitive is Dios) is the name of several women in Greek mythology:

- Dione, a goddess worshipped at Dodona. She is variously described as both an Oceanid, as the daughter of Oceanus and Tethys, and a Titaness, as the daughter of Gaia and Uranus. She is often said to be the mother of Aphrodite by Zeus. The name is sometimes used as an epithet of Aphrodite/Venus herself.
- Dione, one of the Hyades, the rain-bringing nymph daughters of Atlas and a mother whose identity varies. She is also said to be a Dodonian nymph who nursed Dionysus in his youth along with the rest of the Dodonian Hyades, and thus potentially identified with the above Dione.
- Dione, a daughter of Atlas who married king Tantalus and bore him Pelops and Niobe. As a daughter of Atlas, she might be identical with the Hyad Dione.
- Dione, one of the fifty Nereids, daughters of Nereus and Doris.
- Dione, mentioned in the Phoenician History, a literary work attributed to Sanchuniathon, as a daughter of Uranus/Heaven and Gaia/Earth, also called Baaltis. She is a sister of Cronus/Elus whom the latter made his wife after their father sent her, and her sisters, to kill him. The latter gave the city Byblos to Dione. The exact identity of this Dione is uncertain: Sanchuniathon may have meant to identify her with Dione the Titaness. From her name Baaltis and association with Byblos she is taken to be Baalat Gebal, the patron goddess of Byblos. However, some scholars identify her with Asherah, proposing that Sanchuniathon merely uses Dione as a translation of Asherah's epithet Elat.

== Bibliography ==
- Apollodorus, The Library with an English Translation by Sir James George Frazer, F.B.A., F.R.S. in 2 Volumes, Cambridge, MA, Harvard University Press; London, William Heinemann Ltd. 1921. ISBN 0-674-99135-4. Online version at the Perseus Digital Library. Greek text available from the same website.
- Euripides, The Complete Greek Drama, edited by Whitney J. Oates and Eugene O'Neill, Jr. in two volumes. 2. Helen, translated by E. P. Coleridge. New York. Random House. 1938. Available at Perseus Digital Library.
- Hard, Robin, The Routledge Handbook of Greek Mythology: Based on H.J. Rose's "Handbook of Greek Mythology", London and New York, Routledge, 2004. ISBN 020344633X. doi:10.4324/9780203446331.
- Hesiod, Theogony, in The Homeric Hymns and Homerica with an English Translation by Hugh G. Evelyn-White, Cambridge, MA., Harvard University Press; London, William Heinemann Ltd. 1914. Online version at the Perseus Digital Library.
- Homer, The Iliad of Homer, rendered into English prose for the use of those who cannot read the original by Samuel Butler. Longmans, Green and Co. 39 Paternoster Row, London. New York and Bombay. 1898 (?). Available at Perseus Digital Library.
- Hyginus, Fabulae from The Myths of Hyginus translated and edited by Mary Grant. University of Kansas Publications in Humanistic Studies. Online version at the Topos Text Project.
- Plato, Symposium in Plato in Twelve Volumes, Vol. 9 translated by Harold N. Fowler. Cambridge, MA, Harvard University Press; London, William Heinemann Ltd. 1925. Available at Perseus Digital Library.
