= Eudora (mythology) =

Greek mythological characters

In Greek mythology, Eudora or Eudore (Ancient Greek: Εὐδώρη means 'she of good gifts') was a name given to three nymphs:

- Eudora, one of 3,000 Oceanids, water-nymph daughters of the Titans Oceanus and his sister-spouse Tethys.
- Eudora, the Nereid. She was one of the 50 sea-nymph daughters of the 'Old Man of the Sea' Nereus and the Oceanid Doris.
- Eudora, called "long-robed" in a Hesiodic fragment, was one of the Hyades, the nymphs associated with the configuration of stars known as the Hyades.
