= Celaeno (Pleiad) =

One of the Pleiades in Greek mythology

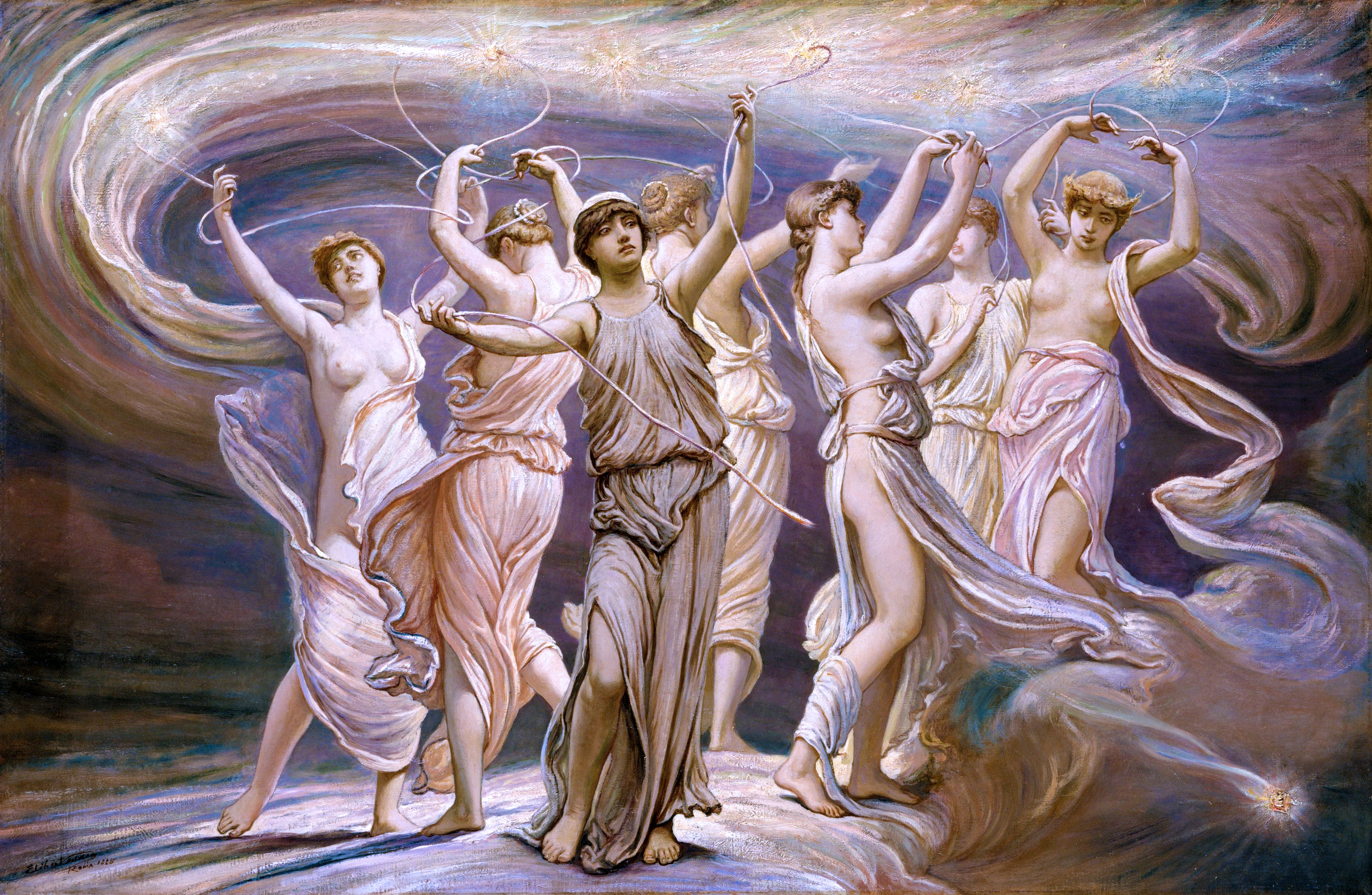
The Pleiades by Elihu Vedder

In Greek mythology, Celaeno (/sɪˈliːnoʊ/; Ancient Greek: Κελαινώ, romanized: Kelainṓ, lit. 'the dark one', also Celeno or Kelaino, sometimes Calaeno) was one of the Pleiades.

== Family ==
Celaeno was the daughter of Atlas and Pleione or Aethra. She was said to have born several children by Poseidon, the number and names of whom vary between sources. Apollodorus gives only one child – Lycus (son of Poseidon), who is sent by his father to dwell in the Fortunate Isles. Hyginus lists three children: Eupemus, Lycus, and Nycteus. A scholium on the Argonautica lists Eurypylus and Lycus as her children, and gives Lycaon and Eurytus as alternative names for them, with Philarchus as the authority.

According to the Byzantine author John Tzetzes, her children were Lycus and Chimaireos by Prometheus.

== Modern references ==
The following modern uses derive from the Ancient Greek mythical name:

- Celaeno, a star in the Pleiades open cluster of stars.
- USS Celeno (AK-76), a United States Navy Crater class cargo ship
- Ship Celaeno builder A. HALL & Co Aberdeen. Rig: SHIP. Construction: Wood. Yard Number: 233. Completed in June 1863. Weighed 702 tons and measured 173.0 feet x 30.2 feet x 18.7 feet. The Celaeno made eleven trips to New Zealand.
