= Coronis (mythology) =

Name of figures in Greek mythology

There are several characters in Greek mythology by the name Coronis (Ancient Greek: Κορωνίς, -ίδος "crow" or "raven", among others). These include:

- Coronis, one of the Hyades.
- Corone, a daughter of King Coronaeus of Phocis who fled from Poseidon and was changed into a crow by Athena.
- Coronis, a Maenad who was raped by Butes of Thrace. Dionysus made the offender throw himself down a well.
- Coronis, who was in one version the mother of the Graces by Dionysus. She may be the same with the above character.
- Coronis, daughter of Phlegyas, king of the Lapiths, was one of Apollo's lovers and mother of Asclepius.
- Coronis, one of the sacrificial victims of Minotaur.

A coronis may also be:

- A vessel with raised ends, like a crescent.
