= Alcyone (Pleiad) =

One of the Pleiades sisters, daughters of Atlas from Greek mythology

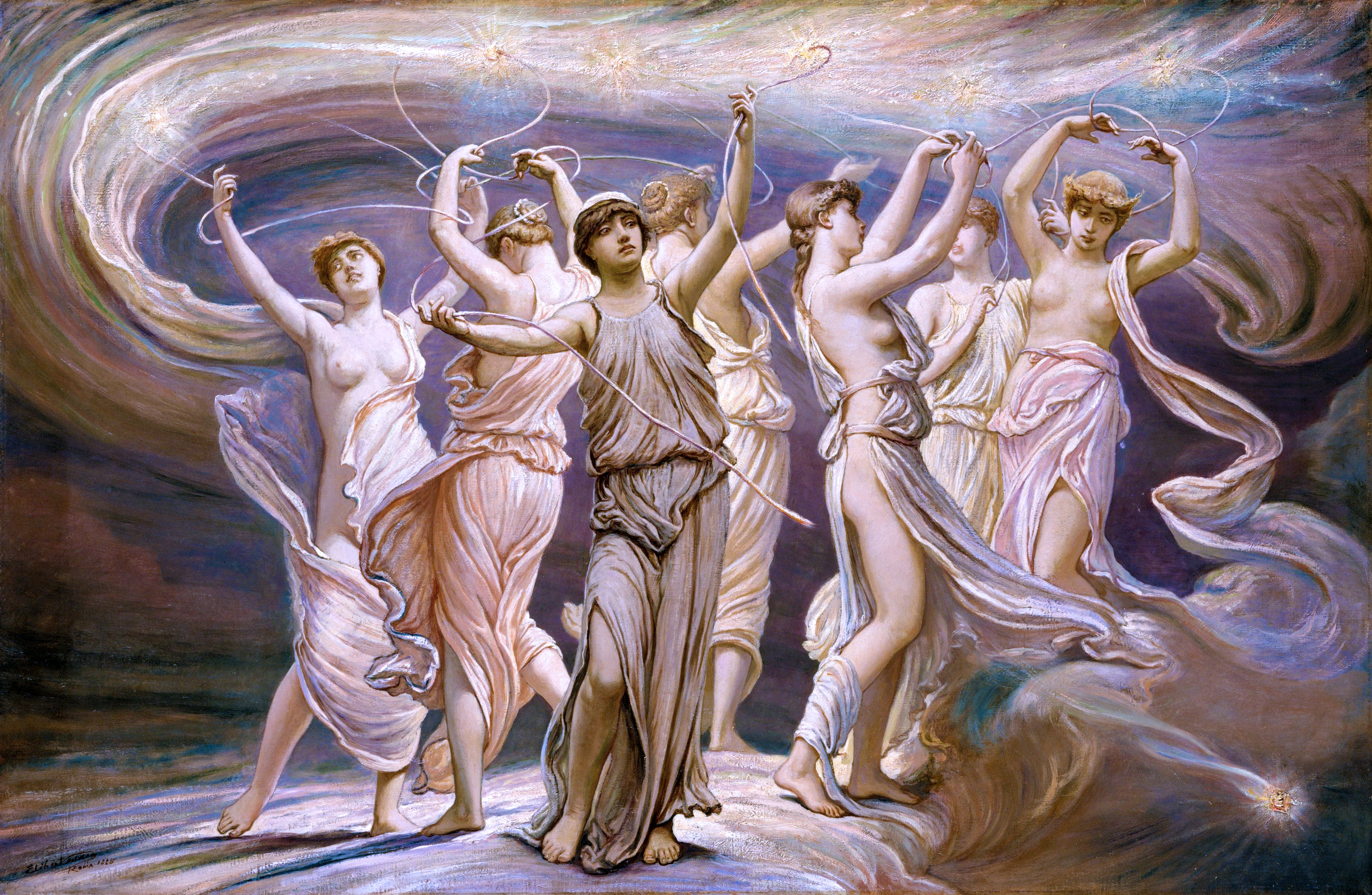
The Pleiades

Alcyone (/ælˈsaɪ.əniː/; Ancient Greek: Ἀλκυόνη, romanized: Alkyóne), in Greek mythology, was the name of one of the Pleiades, daughters of Atlas and Pleione or, more rarely, Aethra.

She attracted the attention of the god Poseidon and bore him several children, variously named in the sources: Hyrieus, Hyperenor, and Aethusa; Hyperes and Anthas; and Epopeus. By a mortal, Anthedon, Alcyone became the mother of the fisherman Glaucus, who was later transformed into a marine god.

== Etymology ==
Alkyóne comes from alkyón (ἀλκυών), which refers to a sea-bird with a mournful song or to a kingfisher bird in particular. The meaning(s) of the words is uncertain because alkyón is considered to be of pre-Greek, non-Indo-European origin. However, folk etymology related them to the háls (ἅλς, "brine, sea, salt") and kyéo (κυέω, "I conceive"). Alkyóne originally is written with a smooth breathing mark, but this false origin beginning with a rough breathing mark (transliterated as the letter H) led to the common misspellings halkyón (ἁλκυών) and Halkyóne (Ἁλκυόνη), and thus the name of one of the kingfisher bird genus' in English Halcyon.

Comparative table of Alcyone's family
Relation	Names	Sources						
Relation	Names	Apollodorus	Ovid	Hyginus		Pausanias	Athenaeus	Clement
Parentage	Atlas and Pleione	✓		✓	✓			
Parentage	Atlas and Aethra			✓				
Consort	Poseidon	✓	✓		✓			✓
Consort	Anthedon						✓	
Children	Aethusa	✓						
Children	Hyrieus	✓		✓	✓			
Children	Hyperenor	✓						
Children	Epopeus				✓			
Children	Hyperes					✓		
Children	Anthas					✓		
Children	Glaucus						✓	
