= Pleione (mythology) =

Greek Oceanid

Pleione (Ancient Greek: Πληιόνη or Πλειόνη, romanized: Plêionê or Πλειόνη; pronounced /plaɪˈoʊniː/ or /pliːˈoʊni/, ply-OH-nee or plee-OH-nee) was an Oceanid nymph in Greek mythology and mother of the Pleiades. Pleione presided over the multiplication of the flocks, fitting, since the meaning of her name is: "to increase in number" (from the Greek word pleiôn πλεῖων "more").

== Family ==
Pleione was the daughter of Oceanus and Tethys who were the Titan God and Goddess of bodies of water.

Pleione was mother to seven daughters, known as the Pleiades. Their names were: Maia, Electra, Taygete, Alcyone, Celaeno, Sterope and Merope. She is often said to be the mother of Calypso with Atlas as well.

Among her grandchildren were the god Hermes and the demigod Iasion.

== Mythology ==
Pleione lived in a southern region of Greece called Arcadia, on a mountain named Mount Cyllene. She married the Titan Atlas and gave birth to the Hyades, Hyas and the Pleiades. She was also the protectress of sailing.

In some accounts, when Pleione once was travelling through Boeotia with her daughters, Orion who was accompanying her, fell in love with the mother and tried to attack her. She escaped but Orion sought her for seven years and couldn't find her, until at last, Zeus pitying the girls, changed them into stars which still continue to fly from Orion.

== Namesake ==
- The star Pleione is named after her.
- A small genus of (predominantly terrestrial) orchids (Pleione) is named after her.
