= Hyades (mythology) =

Nymphs that bring rain in Greek mythology

In Greek mythology, the Hyades (Ancient Greek: Ὑάδες, romanized: Hyádes, popularly "rain-makers" or "the rainy ones"; from ὕω, hýō, 'I fall as rain', but probably from ὗς, hŷs, 'swine'; /ˈhaɪ.ə.diːz/, HIGH-ə-deez) are a sisterhood of nymphs that bring rain.

== Family ==
The Hyades were daughters of Atlas (by either Pleione or Aethra, one of the Oceanids) and sisters of Hyas in most tellings, although one version gives their parents as Hyas and Boeotia. The Hyades are sisters to the Pleiades and the Hesperides.

== Names ==
Their number varies from three in the earliest sources to fifteen in the late ones. The names are also variable, according to the mythographer, and include:

Comparative table of Hyades' names, number and family
Relation	Name	Sources									
Relation	Name	Hes.	Thales	Eurip.	Dio.	Hyg.	Theon	Serv.	Hesych	Eust.	Unknown
Parentage	Atlas and Aethra					✓				✓	
Parentage	Atlas and Pleione					✓					
Parentage	Hyas and Boeotia					✓					
Parentage	Cadmilus						✓				
Parentage	Erechtheus							✓			
Parentage	Hyas and Aethra										✓
Number		5	2	3	3	5	3	5	1	3	2
Names	Phaisyle ('filtered light') or Aesyle	✓		not stated		✓	not stated			✓	
Names	Coronis ('crow')	✓		not stated	✓	✓	not stated				
Names	Cleeia ('famous') or Cleis	✓		not stated	✓		not stated				
Names	Phaeo ('dim')	✓		not stated			not stated				
Names	Eudora ('generous')	✓		not stated		✓	not stated			✓	
Names	Philia			not stated	✓		not stated				
Names	Ambrosia			not stated		✓	not stated			✓	
Names	Polyxo			not stated		✓	not stated				
Names	Pytho			not stated			not stated	✓			
Names	Synecho			not stated			not stated	✓			
Names	Baccho			not stated			not stated	✓			
Names	Cardie			not stated			not stated	✓			
Names	Niseis			not stated			not stated	✓			
Names	Dione			not stated			not stated		✓		
Names	Thyone			not stated			not stated				✓
Names	Prodice			not stated			not stated				✓

Additionally, Thyone and Prodice were supposed to be daughters of Hyas by Aethra, and have been added to the group of stars.

== Mythology ==
The main myth concerning the Hyades accounts for their collective name and provides an etiology for their weepy raininess: after the death of Hyas in a hunting accident his sisters (or daughters) the Hyades wept from their grief. Jupiter/Zeus changed them into a cluster of stars, the Hyades, set in the head of Taurus.

The Greeks believed that the heliacal rising and setting of the Hyades star cluster always accompanied rain, hence the association of the Hyades (sisters of Hyas) and the Hyades (daughters of ocean) with the constellation of the Hyades (rainy ones).

The Hyades also functioned as the tutors of Dionysus in some tellings of the latter's infancy, and as such are equated with the Nysiads, the nymphs who also traditionally cared for Dionysus, as well as with other reputed nurses of the god—the Lamides, the Dodonides and the nymphs of Naxos. Some sources relate that they were subject to aging, but Dionysus, to express his gratitude for their having raised him, asked Medea to restore their youth.

In Tennyson's poem, Ulysses recalls his travels of old:

I cannot rest from travel: I will drink -
Life to the lees: All times I have enjoy'd -
Greatly, have suffer'd greatly, both with those -
That loved me, and alone, on shore, and when -
Thro' scudding drifts the rainy Hyades -
Vext the dim sea ..."

== In astronomy ==
A well-studied star cluster in Taurus and the open cluster nearest Earth is named after the Hyades of Greek mythology.

== See also ==
- Nephele (Ancient Greek rain goddess)
