= Sterope (Pleiad) =

One of the seven Pleiades sisters from Greek mythology

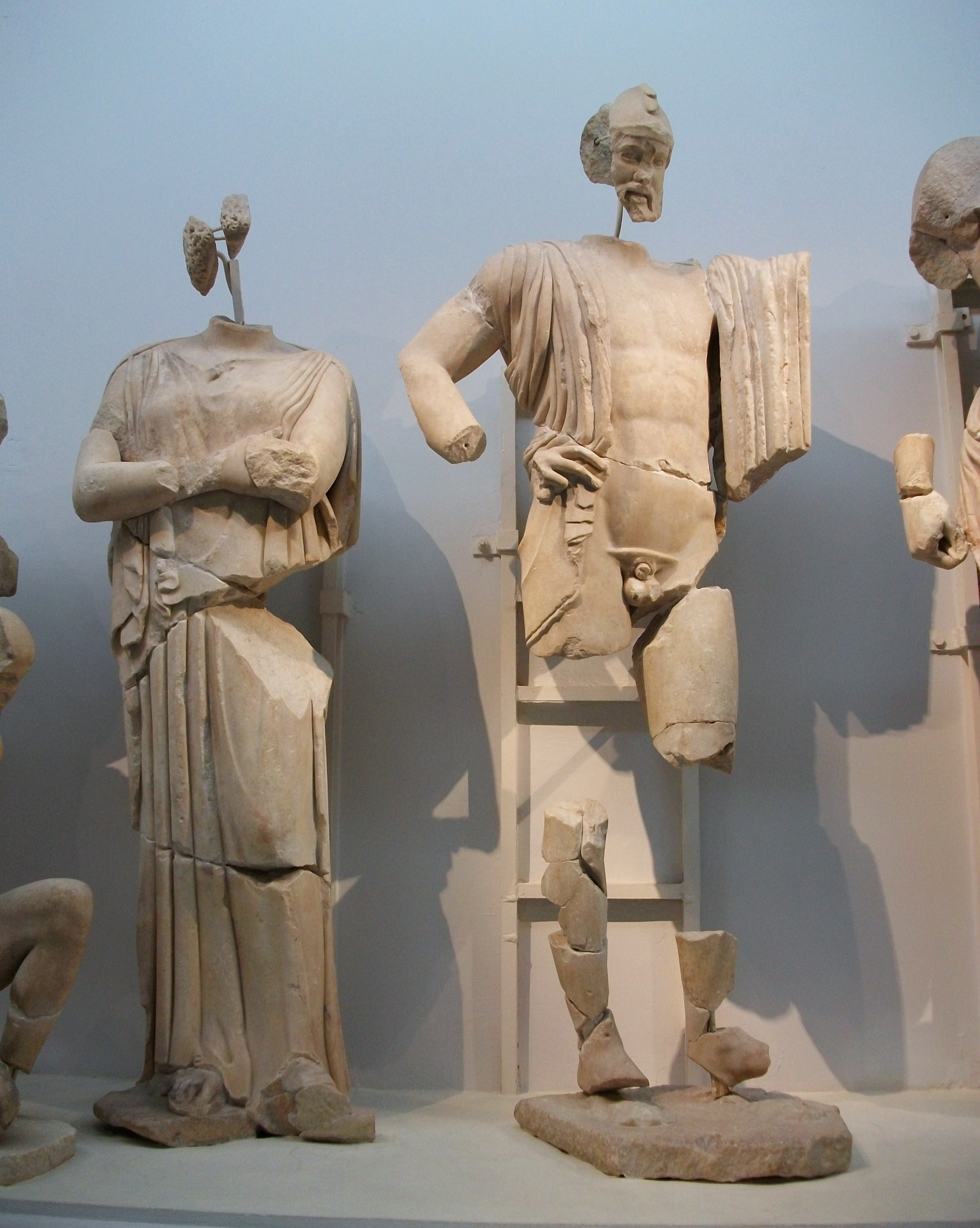
Statues of Sterope and Oenomaus, from the Temple of Zeus, Olympia

In Greek mythology, Sterope (/ˈstɛrəpiː/; Ancient Greek: Στερόπη, [sterópɛː], from στεροπή, steropē, 'lightning'), also called Asterope (Ἀστερόπη), was one of the seven Pleiades.

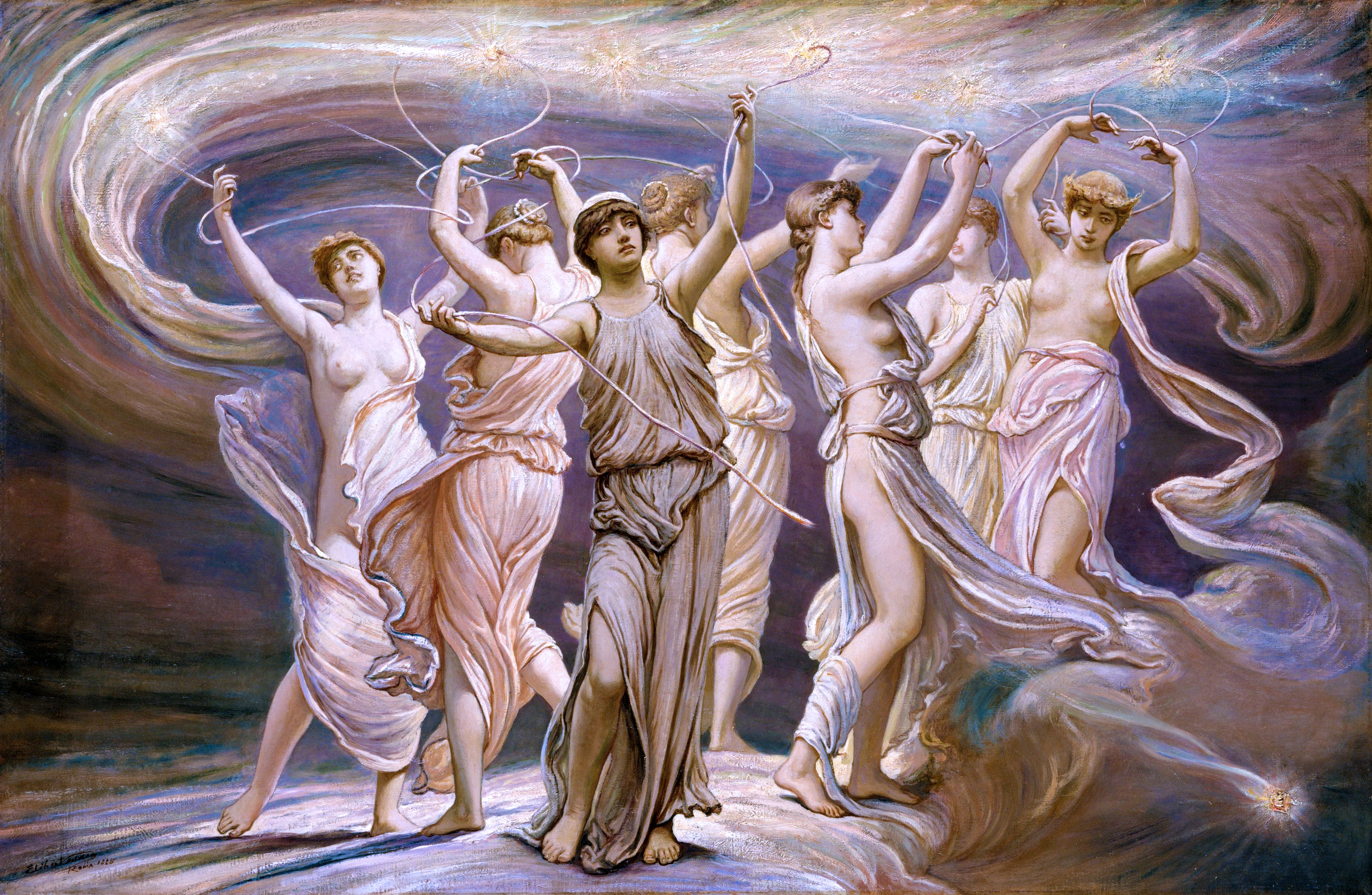
The Pleiades by Elihu Vedder

== Biography ==
Sterope was the daughter of Atlas and Pleione, born to them at Mount Cyllene in Arcadia. She was the wife of King Oenomaus of Pisa, or according to some accounts, his mother by Ares or Hyperochus. Sterope was also credited to be the mother of Evenus (father of Marpessa) by Ares.
