= Aethra (mythology) =

Figures in greek mythology

In Greek mythology, Aethra or Aithra (Ancient Greek: Αἴθρα, romanized: Aíthra, lit. 'bright sky', pronounced [ǎi̯tʰra], /ˈɛ.θra/, EH-thra or AY-thruh, English: /ˈiːθrə/, EE-thruh) was a name applied to four different individuals:

- Aethra, name of one of the Oceanids, the 3000 daughters of Oceanus and Tethys. She is sometimes called the wife of Atlas and mother of the Pleiades, Hyades (more usually the offspring of Pleione) and Hyas.
- Aethra (possibly same as above) is, in one source, called the wife of Hyperion, rather than Theia, and mother of Helios, Eos, and Selene.
- Aethra, daughter of King Pittheus of Troezen and mother of Theseus either by Poseidon or Aegeus. This is the same Aethra who went to Troy with Helen as one of her two handmaidens.
- Aethra, wife of the Spartan Phalanthus. With her tears she fulfilled a prophecy given to her husband, after which he conquered Tarentum for himself.
