= Pleiades (Greek mythology) =

Seven mythological sister-nymphs

The Pleiades
- The Seven Star-nymph Sisters
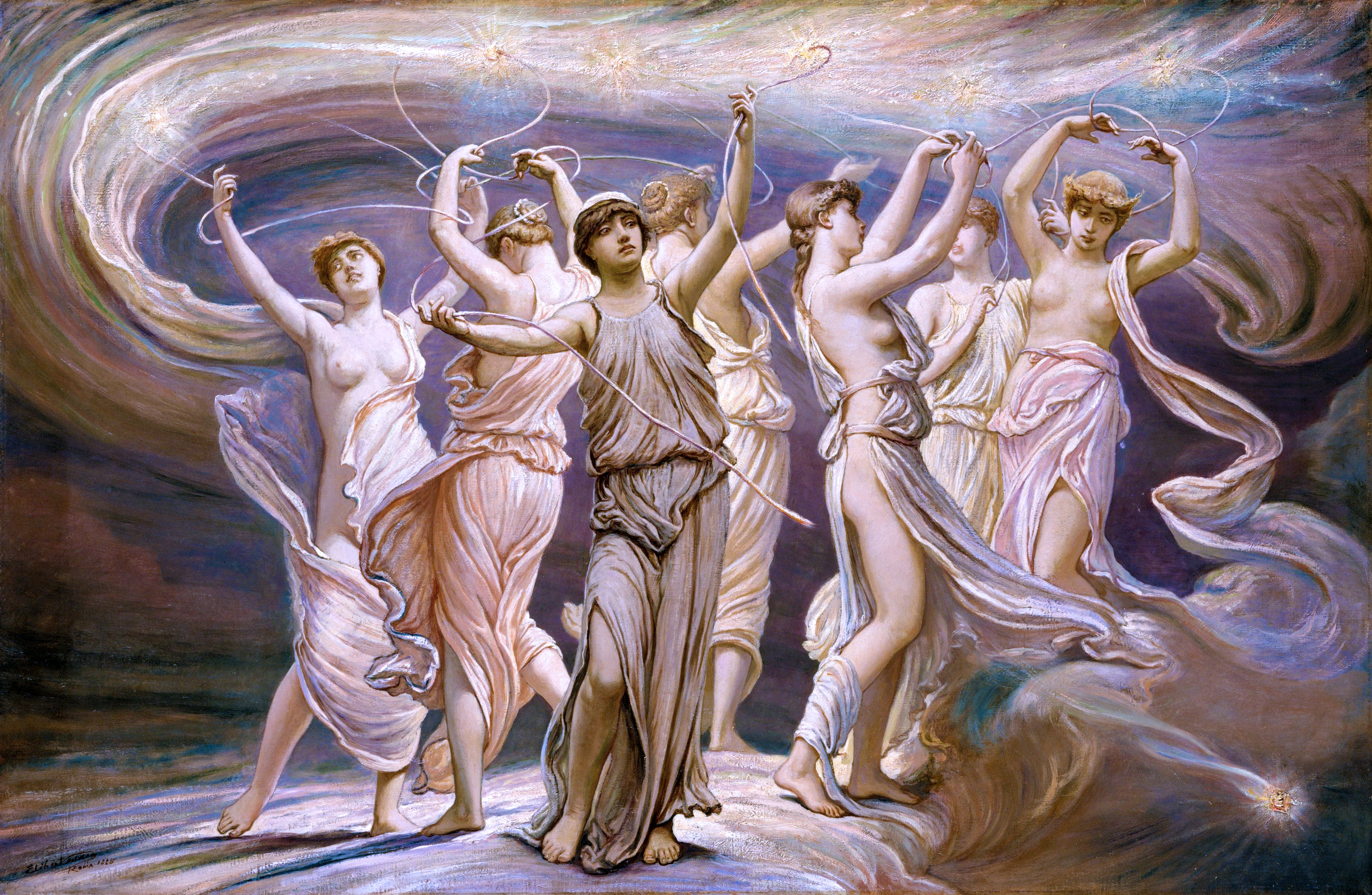
- The Pleiades by Elihu Vedder
- Abode: Mt. Cyllene on Arcadia
- Parents: Atlas and Pleione or Aethra

The Pleiades (Ancient Greek: Πλειάδες, pronounced [pleːádes], /ˈpliːədiːz, ˈpleɪ-, ˈplaɪ-/, PLEE-uh-deez, PLAY-, PLY-) were the seven sister-nymphs, companions of Artemis, the goddess of the hunt. Together with their sisters, the Hyades, they were sometimes called the Atlantides, Dodonides, or Nysiades, nursemaids and teachers of the infant Dionysus. The Pleiades were thought to have been translated to the night sky as a cluster of stars, the Pleiades, and were associated with rain.

== Etymology ==
The name Pleiades ostensibly derived from the name of their mother, Pleione, effectively meaning "daughters of Pleione". However, etymologically, the name of the star-cluster likely came first, and Pleione's name indicated that she was the mother of the Pleiades. According to another suggestion Pleiades derived from πλεῖν (plein, "to sail") because of the cluster's importance in delimiting the sailing season in the Mediterranean Sea: "the season of navigation began with their heliacal rising".

== Family ==
The Pleiades' parents were the Titan Atlas and the Oceanid Pleione born on Mount Cyllene. In some accounts, their mother was called Aethra, another Oceanid. Aside from the above-mentioned sisters (the Hyades), the Pleiades' other siblings were Hyas and the nymph Calypso who was famous in the tale of Odysseus. Sometimes they were related as half-sisters to the Hesperides, nymphs of the evening and sunset.

== Names ==
Several of the most prominent male Olympian gods (including Zeus, Poseidon, and Ares) engaged in affairs with the seven heavenly sisters. These relationships resulted in the birth of their children.

1. Maia, eldest of the seven Pleiades, was mother of Hermes by Zeus.
2. Electra, mother of Dardanus and Iasion, by Zeus.
3. Taygete, mother of Lacedaemon, also by Zeus.
4. Alcyone, mother of Hyrieus, Hyperenor and Aethusa; Hyperes and Anthas; and Epopeus by Poseidon.
5. Celaeno, mother of Lycus and Nycteus by Poseidon; and of Eurypylus and Euphemus also by Poseidon.
6. Sterope, also Asterope, mother of King Oenomaus of Elis by Ares or wife of Oenomaus instead.
7. Merope, youngest of the Pleiades. In other mythic contexts, she married Sisyphus and, becoming mortal, faded away. Merope bore Sisyphus several sons including Glaucus.

== Mythology ==
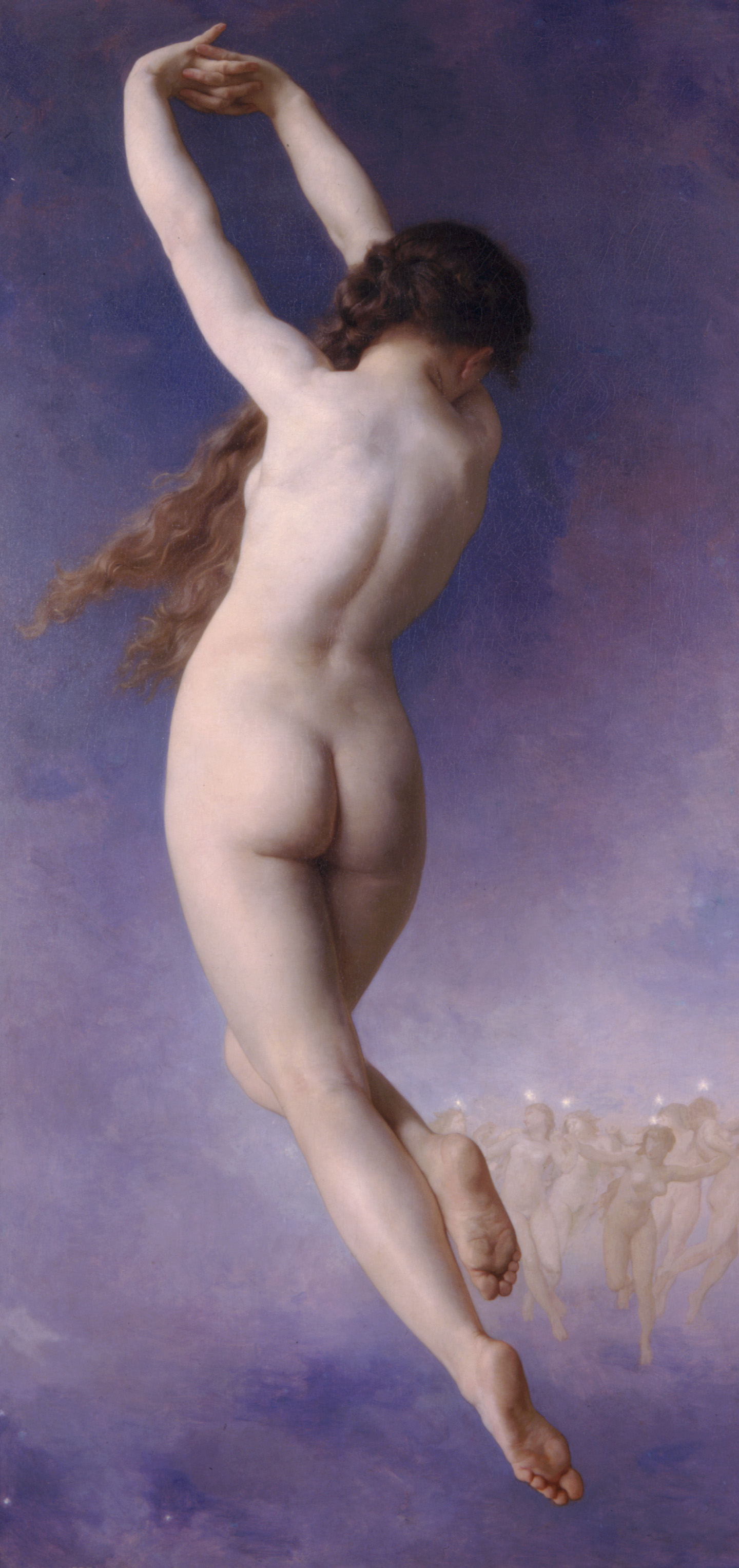
Lost Pleiad (1884) by William-Adolphe Bouguereau.

After Atlas was forced to carry the heavens on his shoulders, Orion began to pursue all of the Pleiades, and Zeus transformed them first into doves, and then into stars to comfort their father. The constellation of Orion is said to still pursue them across the night sky.

One of the most memorable myths involving the Pleiades is the story of how these sisters literally became stars, their catasterism. According to some versions of the tale, all seven sisters killed themselves because they were so saddened by either the fate of their father, Atlas, or the loss of their siblings, the Hyades. In turn, Zeus, the ruler of the Greek gods, immortalized the sisters by placing them in the sky. There these seven stars formed the star cluster known thereafter as the Pleiades.

The Greek poet Hesiod mentions the Pleiades several times in his Works and Days. As the Pleiades are primarily winter stars, they feature prominently in the ancient agricultural calendar. Here is a bit of advice from Hesiod:

And if longing seizes you for sailing the stormy seas,
when the Pleiades flee mighty Orion
and plunge into the misty deep
and all the gusty winds are raging,
then do not keep your ship on the wine-dark sea
but, as I bid you, remember to work the land.

— Works and Days 618–623

The Pleiades would "flee mighty Orion and plunge into the misty deep" as they set in the West, which they would begin to do just before dawn during October–November, a good time of the year to lay up your ship after the fine summer weather and "remember to work the land"; in Mediterranean agriculture autumn is the time to plough and sow.

The poet Sappho mentions the Pleiades in one of her poems:

The moon has gone
The Pleiades gone
In dead of night
Time passes on
I lie alone

The poet Lord Tennyson mentions the Pleiades in his poem "Locksley Hall":

Many a night I saw the Pleiads, rising through the mellow shade,
Glitter like a swarm of fire-flies tangled in a silver braid.

The loss of one of the sisters, Merope, in some myths may reflect an astronomical event wherein one of the stars in the Pleiades star cluster disappeared from view by the naked eye.

== Alternative version ==
Although most accounts are uniform as to the number, names, and main myths concerning the Pleiades, the mythological information recorded by a scholiast on Theocritus' Idylls with reference to Callimachus has nothing in common with the traditional version. According to it, the Pleiades were daughters of an Amazonian queen; their names were Maia, Coccymo, Glaucia, Protis, Parthenia, Stonychia, and Lampado. They were credited with inventing ritual dances and nighttime festivals.

== See also ==
- Alexandrian Pleiad
- Kṛttikā
- Peleiades
- Seven-dots glyph
