= Hyas =

Son of Atlas in Greek mythology

Hyas (Ancient Greek: Ὑάς, romanized: Hūás, lit. 'rain' from hyô, hyetos', [hyːás]; /ˈhaɪ.əs/), in Greek mythology, was a Boeotian who was regarded as the ancestor of the ancient Hyantes (Ὕαντες), who were the aboriginal inhabitants of Boeotia.

== Family ==
Hyas was the son of the Titan Atlas and either of the Oceanids, Pleione or Aethra, thus brother to the Pleiades and Hyades. In one account, Hyas instead was called the father of the Hyades by Boeotia.

== Mythology ==
=== Death ===
Hyas was a notable archer who was killed by his intended prey. Some stories have him dying after attempting to rob a lion of its cubs.

''While his [i.e. Hyas] beard was fresh, stags trembled in terror before him, and the hare was welcome prey. But when years matured his manhood, he breavely closed with the shaggy lioness and the boar. He sought the lair and brood of the whelped lioness and was bloody prey to the Libyan beast.''

Some have Hyas killed by a serpent, but most commonly he is said to have been gored by a wild boar. His sisters, the Hyades, mourned his death with so much vehemence and dedication that they died of grief. Zeus, in recognition of their familial love, took pity upon them and changed them into stars—the constellation Hyades—and placed them in the head of Taurus, where their annual rising and setting are accompanied by plentiful rain.

''His {i.e. Hyas]] mother [Aethra] sobbed for Hyas, his sad sisters sobbed and Atlas, whose neck would haul the world. The sisters surpassed both parents in pious love and won heaven. Their name is from Hyas."

=== Interpretation ===
The mythological use for a Hyas, apparently a back formation from Hyades, may simply have been to provide a male figure to consort with the archaic rain-nymphs, the Hyades, a chaperone responsible for their behavior, as all the archaic sisterhoods— even the Muses— needed to be controlled under the Olympian world-picture. In fact among the poets it is immaterial whether Hyas is described as their father or their brother. And his death gave these weepy rain-nymphs a cause for their weeping, mourning for a male being an acceptably passive female role in the patriarchal culture of the Hellenes. Hyas had no separate existence except as progenitor/guardian of the Hyantes, neither in mythic narrative nor in rite, even the alternative accounts of his demise being somewhat conventional and interchangeable: compare the death of Meleager or Actaeon.

== Hyantes ==
The Hyantes, descendants of Hyas, was the former name of the Boeoitians, who were expelled from Boeotia by the Phoenicians led by Cadmus. Into late Classical times (as by Pausanias, for example), Cadmus was remembered as having been a Phoenician, or at least backed by a Phoenician army.

Some of the Hyantes are said to have emigrated to isolated and pastoral Phocis, where they founded Hyampolis. Others supposedly fled to Aetolia, another region that retained a primitive character into Classical times.
