= Ida (nurse of Zeus) =

Nurse of the infant Zeus in Greek mythology

In Greek mythology, Ida or Ide (Ancient Greek: Ἴδη, romanized: Idē, lit. 'timber' or 'woodland'; pronounced /ˈiː.də/ or /ˈiː.daː/, EE-dah or Eye-duh) was one of the nurses of the infant Zeus on Crete.

== Mythology ==
According to Apollodorus, Rhea gave the infant Zeus to the nymphs Adrasteia and Ida, daughters of Melisseus, to nurse, and they fed Zeus on the milk of the goat Amalthea. According to Hyginus, Ida and Adrasteia (along with Amalthea) were daughters of Oceanus, whom "others say they were the daughters of Melisseus". She was associated with the Cretan Mount Ida.

According to the second-century geographer Pausanias, Ida was represented on the altar of Athena Alea at Tegea. Ida was one of eight nymphs on either side of the central figures of Rhea and the nymph Oenoe holding the infant Zeus. On one side were Glauce, Neda, Theisoa and Anthracia, and on the other Ida, Hagno, Alcinoe and Phrixa.

According to Diodorus Siculus, Zeus rewarded Ida and Adrasteia by turning them into the constellations of Ursa Major and Ursa Minor.
