= Theisoa =

Theisoa may refer to:

- Theisoa (nymph), one of the nymphs in Greek mythology
- Theisoa (moth), a genus of the moth family Gelechiidae
- Theisoa, Greece, a village in the municipal unit of Andritsaina, Elis, Greece
- Theisoa (Arcadia), a town of ancient Arcadia, Greece
- Theisoa (Orchomenus), a town of ancient Arcadia, Greece
