= Kouretes (guardians of Zeus) =

- Guardians of Zeus; Fertility and oracular deities
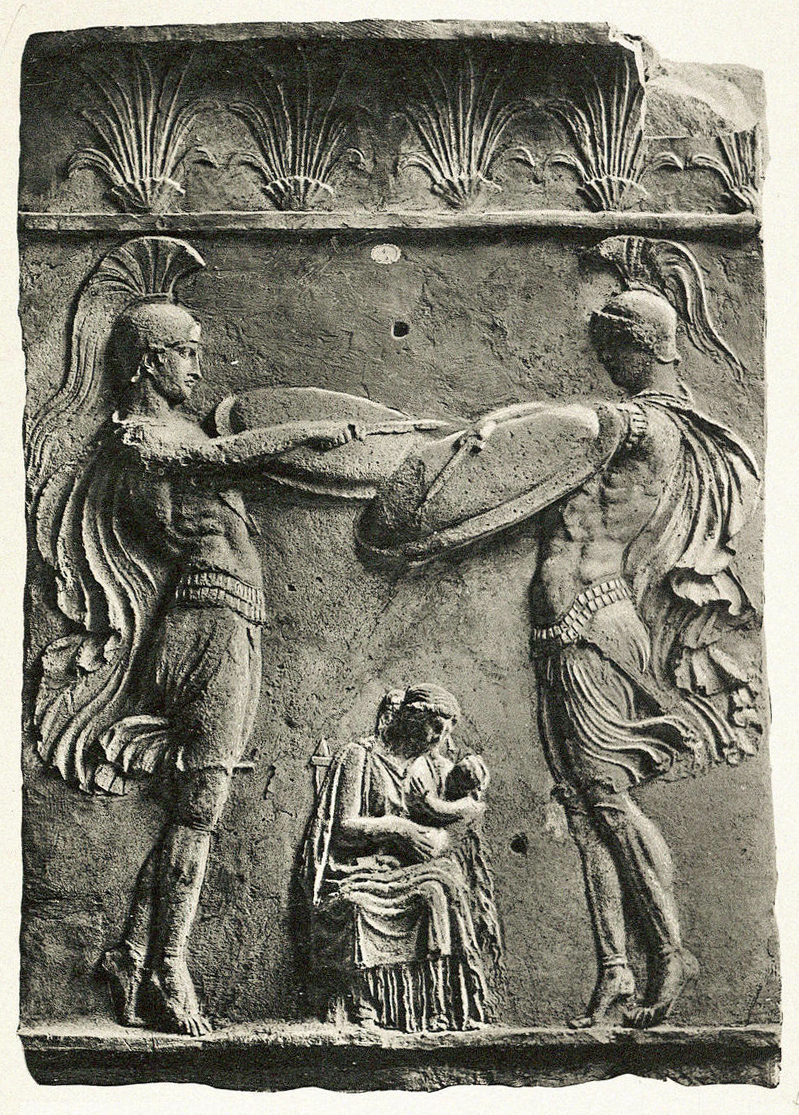
- Two Kouretes carrying swords and shields, guarding Amalthea with the infant Zeus

Genealogy
- Parents: Dorus / Hecaterus and daughter of Phoroneus (Hesiod); None / Autochthon (other traditions)
- Siblings: Satyrs and Oreads (Hesiod)

The Kouretes (Ancient Greek: Κουρῆτες), in the Ancient Greek religion and mythology, are a group of divinities primarily associated with the infancy of Zeus, the King of the Gods and Heaven, where they acted as his guardians. In mythology, the Kouretes' primary tale describes them as guardians of the infant Zeus; they performed war dances and banged their weapons on their shields to drown out his cries and prevent his father Cronus from hearing the child. Other myths involve the group protecting Leto during her pregnancy with Artemis and Apollo from Hera, abducting Epaphus from Io at Hera's request, and advising King Minos of Crete on how to find his son. While references to the Kouretes can be found throughout the Archaic and Classical eras, their myth did not fully crystallize into its most well-known version until the Hellenistic era, attested with Callimachus' "Hymn to Zeus".

In cult, the Kouretes were linked to Zeus and oftentimes treated as fertility deities, with their cult being widespread in Crete, Zeus' birthplace. As indicated by the Hymn to Dictaean Zeus found at Palaikastro, ritual activities involved male youths embodying the role of the Kouretes, performing war dances, and calling Zeus to bring fertility and prosperity; it has been speculated that this practises date at least to the 8th century BC and influenced the mythological role of the group. Outside of Crete, cults dedicated to the Kouretes could be found across the Greek world. The Kouretes were often identified or syncretized with other similar groups in both mythic narratives and cult activities. The group they were most heavily linked with were the Korybantes, who were the attendants of the Phrygian goddess Cybele (syncretized with Zeus' mother Rhea).

== Origin and etymology ==
The Kouretes' name is identical to the word kouroi and means "[male] youths". Excavations that have taken place in Crete show the presence of multiple cave-sanctuaries that acted as holy sites and dated to the Minoan civilization (c. 3100 – c. 1100 BC). It is believed that the Kouretes and their role in mythology were influenced by actual practices that involved war dances performed by male youths during initiations rituals in honor of a young Zeus. The presence of bronze shields discovered at the Psychro Cave, dating to the Orientalizing period, attest to the existence of such initiation festivals, akin to the myth of the Kouretes, dating to at least the 8th century BC.

== Mythology and literature ==
=== General overview ===
The Kouretes are traditionally depicted as a youthful group of deities — alternatively described as daimons, spirits, or "minor Cretan divinities" — that were the attendants of the Titaness Rhea and helped her hide her son Zeus from his father Cronus. After Rhea gave birth to the child, she (or Gaia) took Zeus and hid him inside a cave in Crete, located either at Dikte or Mount Ida. The Kouretes performed a war dance and clashed their weapons against their shields at the cave's entrance to conceal the baby's cries and prevent Cronus from hearing them. The group's number, their names, and genealogy varies from one source to the other. According to Edward Tripp there are three primary myths involving the Kouretes, with one of them being their guardianship of Zeus. The two other myths include their encounter with King Minos of Crete, giving him advice, and their abduction of the infant Epaphus from Io at Hera's request.

=== Archaic era ===
In the Hesiod's Theogony (8th century BC), while the infancy of Zeus is discussed — with his mother Rhea hiding him in Crete — no mention is made of the Kouretes across the entire poem. Despite their absence in the Theogony, Hesiod was aware of the group. In his fragmentary poem the Catalogue of Women — the group's earliest appearance — the Kouretes are identified as descendants of Dorus. The poem describes a daughter of Phoroneus marrying a man, either Dorus himself or Hecaterus, and giving birth to five daughters. Those daughters in turn gave birth to the Kouretes, alongside the satyrs and the Oreads (mountain nymphs). The text describes the Kouretes as dancing, playful figures, and while they are divine beings, they are acknowledged as lesser to the gods. According to academics Apostolos Athanassakis and Benjamin M. Wolkow, their connection to the satyrs and Oreads in the Catalogue of Women suggests that the Kouretes already had an association with Dionysian figures.

The poet and seer Epimenides (7th-6th century BC) was among the earliest individuals to write about the Kouretes, having composed an account of their birth (alongside the Korybantes) that, in conjunction with his Theogony, amounted to 5.000 lines. The epic poem Phoronis (7th-6th century BC), focused on the hero Phoroneus and his descendants. In Phoronis, the Kouretes are described as Phrygians and musicians that play the flute; the Dactyls, originating from Mount Ida, are also descended from Phoroneus. The poem has been described as an example of the syncretism between the Kouretes and Korybantes — the attendants of Cybele — who are usually placed in Phrygia, while the Kouretes are situated in Crete. The poet Corinna wrote about the infancy of Zeus in "Contest of Cithaeron and Helicon"; in a departure from Hesiod's narrative, she includes the Kouretes and describes them as helping hide the infant from his father Cronus. The exact time period she lived in is uncertain, but if she is dated to the archaic period, this would make her among the earliest writers to recognize the Kouretes' existence.

=== Classical era ===
The playwright Euripides (c. 480 – c. 406 BC) references the Kouretes in the play The Bacchae (405 BC), where the chorus sings of their presence in the cave where Zeus was born, and how the group danced to the beat of drums and auloi; academic Timothy Gantz notes that the text does not specify if the dance and music, particularly the drums, were used to specifically drown out Zeus' cries. The Bacchae depicts the Korybantes as also being present during Zeus' birth and that they invented the drum, which was then passed down to Rhea; afterwards, it was stolen by satyrs, being used in Dionysian rituals. Academic Timothy Gantz argues that the identification between the Kouretes and Korybantes was due to the syncretism of Rhea and Cybele. It has been noted that the play also links the Kouretes with the bacchae / maenads, who are the attendants of Dionysus; both groups are depicted as ecstatic dancers, and Zeus is Dionysus' father.

Outside of The Bacchae, Euripides also references the Kouretes in his lost tragedy the Cretans, linking them to Zeus of Mount Ida, Zagreus, and the "mountain mother". A fragment from the Cretans also suggests that an initiatory ritual involving the Kouretes existed that was Orphic in nature. Scholar Walter Burkert highlights that the reference Euripides makes to the Kouretes as the "mystai [priests] of Idaean Zeus", may not be an accurate representation of their cult but a form of "poetic imagination". Another one of Euripides' lost plays, Hypsipyle, describes the Kouretes as being mortal.

=== Hellenistic and Roman eras ===
The "Hymn to Zeus" by Callimachus (c. 310 – c. 240 BC) contains the first explicit depiction of the Kouretes as the guardians of Zeus during his infancy, and the first instance of them clashing their armor and weapons to hide his cries. Despite this, it has been argued that the tradition of the Kouretes guarding the infant Zeus is even older; it is alluded to in Euripides' Bacchae. Strabo (64 or 63 BC – c. 24 AD) recounts a myth of the group guarding Leto's children — Artemis and Apollo — from Hera's wrath. The Roman poet Hyginus recounts in the Fabulae (1st century BC–1st century AD) the Kouretes' noisemaking to hide Zeus.

In the Bibliotheca (1st-2nd century AD), by Apollodorus/Pseudo-Apollodorus, a myth in which the Kouretes abduct the infant Epaphus, a son of Zeus, from his mother Io at Here's behest. For this transgression, Zeus killed them. This myth has been recognized as being "curious" and that the Kouretes' role in it seems "ill-suited" given their traditional position as Zeus' guardians. Scholars have argued that the group was likely being syncretized with another one of Egyptian origin and that this was not part of their traditional mythology; it has been noted that Io's search for Epaphus evokes Isis' search for Osiris. Another tale recounts King Minos going to the Kouretes for advice on finding his lost son Glaucus, depicting the group as oracular divinities. The geographer Pausanias (c. 110 – c. 180), in Description of Greece, describes the Kouretes as being identical to the Dactyls and that the group consisted of five brothers; Heracles, Paeonaeus, Epimedes, Iasius, and Idas.

== Cult ==
=== Crete ===
The Kouretes had cultic activity in Crete, with their depiction in the Hymn to Dictaean Zeus — as protectors of herds and guaranteers of oaths — being widespread across the island. It is unclear if their cult and initiatory rituals in other areas had a similar character. The Hymn to Dictaean Zeus was discovered at Palaikastro and likely dates to the 4th century BC. In it, the Kouretes are described as daemons and Zeus as their leader and "greatest Kouros", leading the group up to Mount Ida. The chorus invites Zeus to return to his birthplace and "jump into" Crete's fields, livestock, cities, houses, ships, and young citizens, so he can bring fertility, prosperity, and wealth to them and the new year. The hymn indicates that the Kouretes were viewed as deities associated with domestic wealth and public welfare. Zeus' cult on Mount Dikte worshipped him as a beardless figure.

At the cave in Mount Ida, bronze shield and drums dating from the 8th-6th centuries BC, during the Orientalizing period, have been found. These items suggests that young men (kouroi) performed an annual war dance celebrating the birth of Zeus and acted as an initiation ritual for these male youths; the dances reenacting the birth and death of Zeus. This annual ceremony celebrated Zeus' birth with a large fire, and every year he is buried by the Kouretes, only to be reborn. Young warrios took part in a dance, aimed at inviting the god to join them and bring prosperity; Burkert argues that the dancing jumps performed by the youths is where the "power of [Zeus] is present", and their dancing was associated with fertility and promoted the growth of crops and flocks. It has been noted that the hymn does not state if the boys alter or dramatize their status in the festival. Burkert speculates that it would have been important for a boy to be accepted into this circle, and that initiates could not have remained for many years. Supposedly, Pythagoras became an initiate of the Kouretes' cult at Mount Ida, entering the tomb of Zeus where he died and was reborn every spring.

=== Elsewhere ===
Thera (Santorini) is one of the earliest-known locations to have had a cult dedicated to Kouretes. Their cult in Olympia was associated with a local Diktaian cave, while in Euboea, they were identified with the Cyclopes and viewed as the inventors of brass weapons. In Messenia, a festival was held in honour of the Kouretes in which animals were sacrificed and offered in a ritualistic fire, indicating their status as fertility deities. The cult of the Kouretes found in Anatolia, particularly in the regions of Ionia and Caria, was the "most remarkable" one to be found outside of Crete; the city of Ephesus was of great importance. Here, the Kouretes were depicted as protecting the children of Leto—Artemis and Apollo—from the wrath of Hera.

== Syncretism with other figures ==
The Greeks regularly conflated the Kouretes with the Korybantes, Cybele's attendants. Rhea herself was often syncretized with Cybele in both cult practises and mythological narrative, which led to their individual attendants also being identified with each other. It has been noted that both the Kouretes and Korybantes share certain traits — both participate in wild dancing and dwell in mountains — that helped facilitate their conflation. Gantz notes that while there is a clear connection between the Kouretes and Korybantes, exactly when and how they came to be syncretized is uncertain. Outside of Pherecydes of Syros (6th century BC) referring to the Korybantes as the children of Apollo and the nymph Rhetia, no other reference to them from the archaid period survives.

The Kouretes were also identified with the Dactyls. According to Hellanicus of Lesbos (c. 490 – c. 405 BC), the Dactyls met Rhea on Mount Ida, which helped facilitate their establishment in Crete and the Troad, while Pausanias describes them being the same as the Kouretes, with Rhea giving Zeus to them. H. J. Rose and B. C Dietrich note that the Kouretes were also associated with the Cabeiri and Cult of Dionysus, which they argue suggests the presence of orgiastic elements being present in their war dances.
