= Adrasteia =

Greek nymph

A figure potentially identifiable with Adrasteia fighting against the Giants on the Gigantomachy frieze of the Pergamon Altar, kept in the Pergamonmuseum, Berlin.

In ancient Greek religion and mythology, Adrasteia (/ˌædrəˈstiːə/; Ancient Greek: Ἀδράστεια, Ionic Greek: Ἀδρήστεια), also spelled Adrastia, Adrastea, Adrestia, Adrestea, Adastreia or Adrasta, originally a Phrygian mountain goddess, probably associated with Cybele, was later a Cretan nymph, and daughter of Melisseus, who was charged by Rhea with nurturing the infant Zeus in secret, to protect him from his father Cronus. By at latest the fifth century BC, she became identified with Nemesis, the goddess of divine retribution.

== Cult ==
Adrasteia was the goddess of "inevitable fate", representing "pressing necessity", and the inescapability of punishment. She had a cult at Cyzicus (with nearby temple), and on the Phrygian Mount Ida. Adrasteia was also the object of public worship in Athens from at least as early as 429 BC. Her name appears in the "Accounts of the Treasurers of the Other Gods", associated with the Thracian goddess Bendis, with whom she seems to have shared a treasury or accounts, indicating that in Athens her cult was supported by public funds.

Adrasteia was also worshipped, together with Nemesis, at Kos. The 2nd-century geographer Pausanias reports seeing a statue of Adrasteia in a temple of Apollo, Artemis, and Leto at Cirrha, near Delphi.

== Mythology ==
Adrasteia came to be associated with the birth of Zeus. In this context she was said to be a nymph of Cretan Mount Ida. The Titaness Rhea gave her son, the infant Zeus, to the Curetes and the nymphs Adrasteia and Ida, daughters of Melisseus, to nurse, and they fed Zeus on the milk of the goat Amalthea. Adrasteia gave Zeus a wondrous toy ball to play with, later used by Aphrodite to bribe her son Eros.

In the Euripidean Rhesus, Adrasteia is said to be the daughter of Zeus.

== Associations with other goddesses ==
=== Cybele ===
Adrasteia seems to have originally been a Phrygian mountain goddess, probably associated with Cybele, the mountain mother goddess of Anatolia. Priapus, Cyzicus, and the Troad, where Adrasteia's cult was established, were also areas where Cybele was especially worshipped. The two earliest mentions of Adrasteia both suggest an association with Cybele. Adrasteia's description, in a fragment from the lost epic poem Phoronis as a Phrygian mountain goddess served by the Idaean Dactyls, is hardly distinguishable from Cybele herself, while Aeschylus locates Adrasteia in the "Berecynthan land", also the home of the "Mother of the Gods" (i.e. Cybele).

=== Nemesis ===
Although apparently of independent origin, Adrasteia also came to be associated with Nemesis, the goddess of divine retribution. Nemesis and Adrasteia were worshipped together at Kos. In the fifth century BC the two goddesses were often identified, with Adrasteia becoming merely an epithet of Nemesis. The explicit identification of the two goddesses is first found in the writings of the late fifth-century BC poet and grammarian Antimachus of Colophon.

=== Artemis ===
Adrasteia, like Nemesis, was also associated with Artemis. The land of the Berecyntians, where a fragment of Aeschylus' lost play Niobe locates the cult of Adrasteia, was also the home of Ephesian Artemis. According to the second-century-BC Greek grammarian Demetrius of Scepsis, a certain Adrastus established Adrasteia as another name for Artemis. As noted above Pausanias saw a statue of Adrasteia in a temple of Artemis near Delphi.

=== Others ===
Adrasteia was also sometimes associated with other goddesses, including the Titan Rhea (who was herself associated with Mother goddess Cybele), Ananke (Necessity), the personification of inevitability, and the Egyptian mother goddess Isis.

== Name ==
The name Adrasteia can be understood as meaning "Inescapable". Several ancient writers, regarding 'Adrasteia' as an epithet for the goddess Nemesis, derived the epithet from the name 'Adrastus'. Adrasteia was the name of a city and a plain in the Troad, a name known to Homer; and according to Strabo, the city and plain were said to have been named after a certain "King Adrastus", of Hellespontine Phrygia, who was said to have built the first temple of Nemesis. Strabo tells us that according to Antimachus, Adrastus "was the first to build an altar to [Nemesis] beside the stream of the Aesepus River", and that according to the fourth-century BC historian Callisthenes (FGrHist 124 F 28), "Adrasteia was named after King Adrastus, who was the first to found a temple of Nemesis". Other ancient writers derived the epithet from the Greek διδράσκω ("run away"), interpreting the epithet to mean the goddess "whom none can escape", connecting the epithet with the fate of the mythical Argive King Adrastus, leader of the doomed Seven against Thebes.

The name Adrasteia (perhaps in connection with the Argive Adrastus) also has geographical associations with Argolis. Pausanias mentions a spring called Adrasteia at Nemea, and Pseudo-Plutarch, mentions a root called Adraseia produced on a mountaintop in Argolis.

== Sources ==
=== Early ===
The earliest surviving references to Adrasteia appear in a fragment from the epic poem the Phoronis (c. sixth century BC), and in a fragment from the lost play Niobe (c. early 5th century BC), by the tragedian Aeschylus. In both she is a Phrygian mountain goddess associated with Mount Ida.

The Phoronis describes Adrasteia as a mountain goddess, whose servants were the Idaean Dactyls, Phrygian "wizards (γόητες) of Ida", who were the first to discover iron and iron working:

... where the wizards of Ida, Phrygian men, had their mountain homes: Kelmis, great Damnameneus, and haughty Akmon, skilled servants of Adrastea of the mountain, they who first, by the arts of crafty Hephaestus, discovered dark iron in the mountain glens, and brought it to the fire, and promulgated a fine achievement.

Aeschylus' Niobe fragment mentions the "territory of Adrasteia" associating it with the Berecyntians, a Phrygian tribe, and Mount Ida:

The land I [Tanatalus] sow extends for twelve days’ journey: the country of the Berecyntians, where the territory of Adrasteia and Mount Ida resound with the lowing and bleating of livestock, and all of the Erechthean plain.

Once in the Aeschylean Prometheus Bound, and twice in the Euripidean Rhesus, Adrasteia is invoked as a ward against the consequences of boastful speech (perhaps here being identified with Nemesis as the punisher of boasts). In Prometheus Bound, after Prometheus foretells the fall of Zeus, the chorus warns Prometheus that the wise "bow to Adrasteia", a formulaic expression meaning to apologize for a remark which might offend some divinity. In the Rhesus, the chorus, because of the praise they are about to give Rhesus, invoke the goddess saying:

May Adrasteia, daughter of Zeus
shield my words from divine hostility!

In a subsequent passage the hero Rhesus invokes her ("may Adrasteia not resent my words") before boasting to the Trojan hero Hector that he will defeat the Greeks at Troy and sack all of Greece.

Adrasteia was explicitly identified with Nemesis by Antimachus of Colophon (late fifth century BC). The geographer Strabo quotes Antimachus as saying:

There is a great goddess Nemesis, who has obtained as her portion all these things from the Blessed. Adrestus was the first to build an altar to her beside the stream of the Aesepus River, where she is worshipped under the name of Adresteia.

In a similar vein to the Aeschylean and Euripidean invocations, Plato, in his Republic (c. 375 BC), has Socrates invoke Arasteia (i.e. Nemesis?) as a ward against divine retribution for—not a boast—but rather an eccentric idea:

I bow myself down before Adrasteia, Glaucon, because of what I am about to say. You see, I really do suppose it a lesser misdemeanor to become the involuntary murderer of someone than to lead people astray about principles of what is fine and good and just.

Plato (followed by the early Stoics) also equates Adrasteia with Fate, as the judge of reincarnating souls:

And this is a law of [Adrasteia], that the soul which follows after God and obtains a view of any of the truths is free from harm until the next period, and if it can always attain this, is always unharmed;

=== Late ===
Both the early 3rd-century BC poet Callimachus, and the mid 3rd-century BC poet Apollonius of Rhodes, name Adrasteia as a nurse of the infant Zeus. According to Callimachus, Adrasteia, along with the ash-tree nymphs, the Meliae, laid Zeus "to rest in a cradle of gold", and fed him with honeycomb, and the milk of the goat Amaltheia. Apollonius of Rhodes, describes a wondrous toy ball which Adrasteia gave the child Zeus, when she was his nurse in the "Idean cave".

According to Apollodorus, Adrasteia and Ida were daughters of Melisseus, who nursed Zeus, feeding him on the milk of Amalthea. Hyginus says that Adrasteia, along with her sisters Ida and Amalthea, were daughters of Oceanus, or that according to "others" they were Zeus's nurses, "the ones that are called Dodonian Nymphys (others call them the Naiads)".

=== Orphic ===
The story of Adrasteia as one of the nurses of Zeus possibly originated as early as a late-fifth-century Orphic theogony (the Eudemian Theogony). Several possible Orphic sources contain accounts of Zeus being nursed by Adrasteia and Ida (here the daughters of Mellissos and Amalthea) and guarded by the Curetes. These have Adrasteia clashing bronze cymbals in front of the cave of Night (Nyx) where the infant Zeus was being concealed, from his father Cronus, so that the infant's cries would not be heard. In one she is said to be a "lawgiver" (νομοθετοῦσα) outside the cave's entrance.

Another later Orphic theogony (the Hieronyman Theogony, c. 200 BC?) has Adrasteia (or Necessity) united with ageless Time (Chronos) at the beginning of the cosmos.

== See also ==
- Korybantes
