= Mount Ida =

Place in Greek mythology

In Greek mythology, two sacred mountains are called Mount Ida, the "Mountain of the Goddess": Mount Ida in Crete, and Mount Ida in the ancient Troad region of western Anatolia (in modern-day Turkey), which was also known as the Phrygian Ida in classical antiquity and is mentioned in the Iliad of Homer and the Aeneid of Virgil. Both are associated with the mother goddess in the deepest layers of pre-Greek myth, in that Mount Ida in Anatolia was sacred to Cybele, who is sometimes called Mater Idaea ("Idaean Mother"), while Rhea, often identified with Cybele, put the infant Zeus to nurse with Amaltheia at Mount Ida in Crete. Thereafter, his birthplace was sacred to Zeus, the king and father of Greek gods and goddesses.

== Etymology ==
The term Ida (Ἴδη) is of unknown origin. Instances of i-da in Linear A probably refer to the mountain in Crete. Three inscriptions bear just the name i-da-ma-te (AR Zf 1 and 2, and KY Za 2), and may refer to mount Ida or to the mother goddess of Ida ( Ἰδαία μάτηρ). In Iliad (Iliad, 2.821), Ἵδη (Ida) means "wooded hill", the name recalling the mountain worship which was a feature of the Minoan mother goddess religion. The name is related to that of the nymph Idaea, who, according to Diodorus Siculus, was the mother of the ten Kuretes. Idaea was also an epithet of Cybele. The Romans knew Cybele as Magna Mater ("Great Mother"), or as Magna Mater deorum Idaea ("great Idaean mother of the gods"), equivalent to the Greek title Meter Theon Idaia ("Mother of the Gods, from Mount Ida"). Proclus considered it as the "mount of the Ideas", whence its etymology.

== Mount Ida, Crete ==
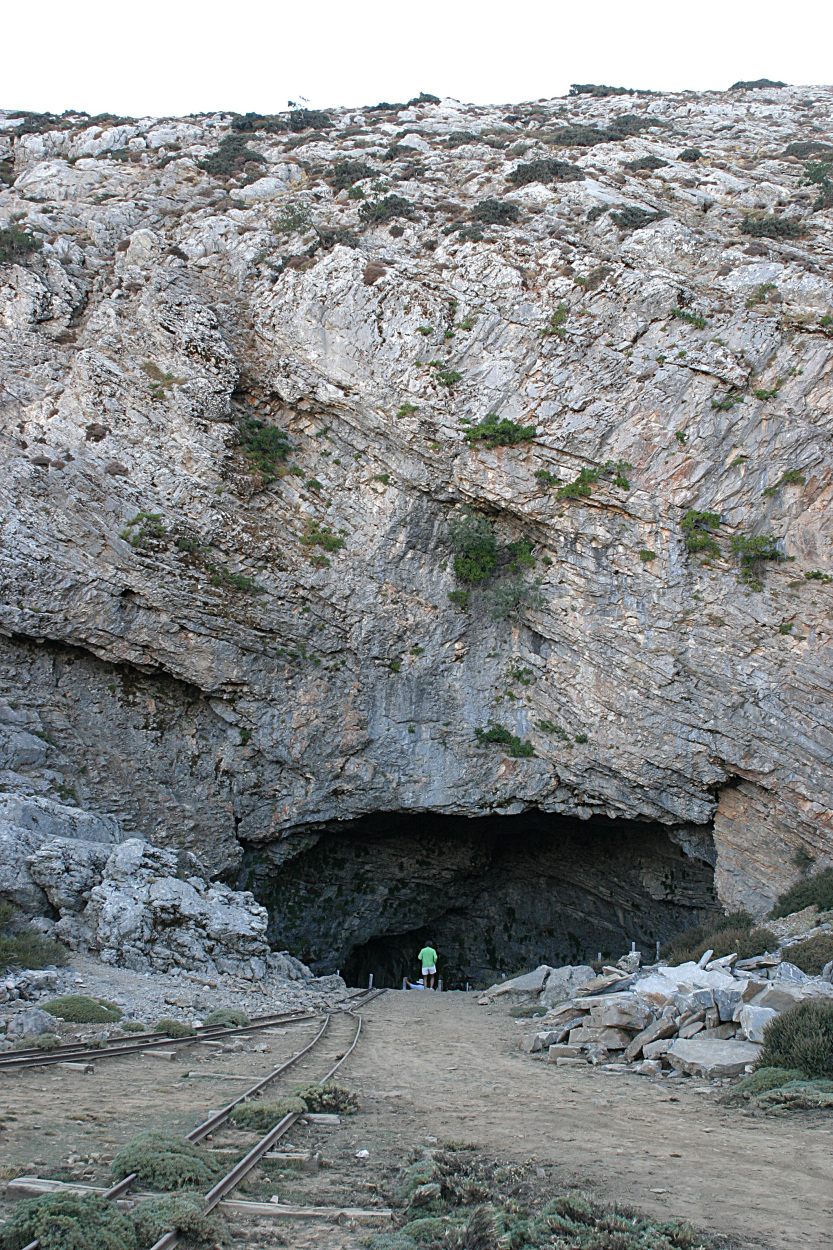
Mouth of Idaean Cave, Crete

Crete's Mount Ida is the island's highest summit, sacred to the Goddess Rhea, and wherein lies the legendary Idaean cave (Ἰδαίον ἅντρον), in which baby Zeus was concealed from his father Cronus. It is one of a number of caves believed to have been the birthplace or hiding place of Zeus. The Kouretes, a band of mythical warriors, undertook to dance their wild, noisy war dances in front of the cave, so that the clamour would keep Cronus from hearing the infant's crying. On the flank of this mountain is the Amari Valley, the site of expansion by the ancient settlement at Phaistos. Its modern name is Psiloritis. The surrounding area and mountain used to be thickly wooded.

== Mount Ida, Anatolia ==
From the Anatolian Mount Ida, Zeus was said to have abducted Ganymede to Olympus. The topmost peak is Gargarus, mentioned in the Iliad. Zeus was located in the Altar of Zeus (near Adatepe, Ayvacık) during the Trojan War. The modern Turkish name for Mount Ida, Turkey, is Kaz Dağı, pronounced [kaz daːɯ]. In the Aeneid, a shooting star falls onto the mountain in answer to the prayer of Anchises to Jupiter (the Roman equivalent of Zeus).

== See also ==
- Sacred mountains
