= Ithome (mythology) =

Messenian nymph and one of the nurses of the child Zeus in Greek mythology

In Greek mythology, Ithome (Ancient Greek: Ἰθώμη) was a Messenian nymph and one of the nurses of the child Zeus.

== Mythology ==
Ithome and Neda brought up and bathed the infant Zeus after he was stolen by the Curetes owing to the danger that threatened from his father. These nymphs gave their name to the mountain Ithome and the river Neda.
