= Melissa (mythology) =

Characters in Greek mythology

In Greek mythology, Melissa (Ancient Greek: Μέλισσα, romanized: Mélissa, lit. 'honeybee') may refer to the following women:

- Melissa, a nymph who discovered and taught the use of honey, and from whom bees were believed to have received their name, μέλισσαι. Bees seem to have been the symbol of nymphs, whence they themselves are sometimes called Melissae, and are sometimes said to have been metamorphosed into bees. Hence also nymphs in the form of bees are said to have guided the colonists that went to Ephesus; and the nymphs who nursed the infant Zeus are called Melissae, or Meliae.
- Melissa, daughter of the Cretan king Melisseus, who, together with her sister Amalthea, fed Zeus with goats' milk. She may be the same as the above Melissa.
- Melissa, daughter of Epidamnus and mother of Dyrrhachius by Poseidon. Her father and son gave their name to the town in Illyria which was called Epidamnos and later on Dyrrhachium.

The name Melissae was transferred to priestesses in general, but more especially to those of Demeter, Persephone, and to the priestesses of the Delphian Apollo. According to the scholiasts of Pindar and Euripides, priestesses received the name Melissae from the purity of the bee.
