= LIMC =

LIMC may refer to:

- Malpensa Airport (ICAO airport code)
- Lexicon Iconographicum Mythologiae Classicae
