= Adraste =

Two figures in Greek mythology

In Greek mythology, Adraste (Ancient Greek: Ἀδρήστη) or Adreste may refer to the following:

- Adrasta, also Adrasteia, a daughter of Oceanus according to the Fabulae. Together with her sisters, Eidothea and Althaea (Amalthea), she was a nurse of the young Zeus.
- Adraste, one of the companions of Helen when Telemachus came to Sparta seeking news of Odysseus. When Helen appeared to greet him, Adraste placed a chair for her, and Alcippe brought a rug of soft wool.
