= Amalthea (mythology) =

Nurse of Zeus in Greek mythology

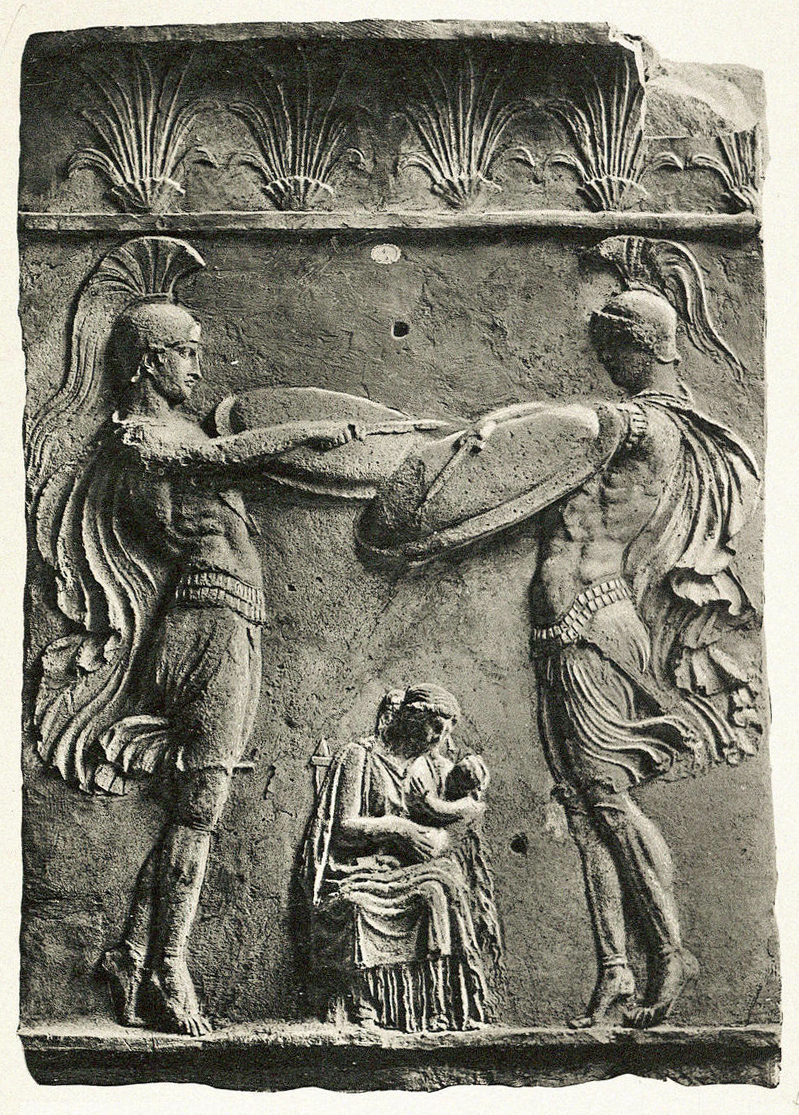
Amalthea holds the young Zeus, behind two Kouretes carrying swords and shields. Campana relief from the late 1st century BC or early 1st century AD, Ny Carlsberg Glyptotek. (Note: Henig, pp. 582–583; Digital LIMC 45699 (Amaltheia 2).)

In Greek mythology, Amalthea or Amaltheia (Ancient Greek: Ἀμάλθεια) is the figure most commonly identified as the nurse of Zeus during his infancy. She is described either as a nymph who raises the child on the milk of a goat or, in some accounts from the Hellenistic period (c. 323–30 BC) onwards, as the goat itself.

From as early as the 6th century BC, there survive references to the "horn of Amalthea" (known in Latin as the cornucopia), a magical horn said to be capable of producing endless amounts of any food or drink desired. In a narrative attributed to the mythical poet Musaeus and dating to around the 4th century BC, Amalthea, a nymph, nurses the infant Zeus and owns a goat which is terrifying in appearance. After Zeus reaches adulthood, he uses the goat's skin as a weapon in his battle against the Titans (the earlier generation of gods). The first known author to describe Amalthea as a goat is the 3rd-century BC poet Callimachus, who presents a rationalised version of the myth in which Zeus is fed on Amalthea's milk. Aratus, also writing in the 3rd century BC, identifies Amalthea with the star Capella, and describes her as "Olenian" (the meaning of which is unclear).

Scholars disagree as to when the tale of Zeus's upbringing was first merged with that of the magical horn. They are explicitly combined by the Roman poet Ovid (1st century BC/AD), whose story of Zeus's nursing weaves together elements from multiple accounts. A passage from a marginal note in a manuscript of Aratus's version has been taken as evidence that the two myths may have been connected prior to Ovid. In the Fabulae, a 2nd-century AD mythological handbook, Amalthea hides the infant in a tree and gathers the Kouretes to dance noisily, so that the child's crying cannot be heard. Other accounts of Zeus's upbringing describe Amalthea as related to Melisseus, the mythical king of Crete, including an Orphic version of the story.

Among the few surviving depictions of Amalthea in ancient art are a relief from the 1st century BC or AD, showing her nursing Zeus between two Kouretes, and coins and medallions from the Roman Empire. Between the 16th and 18th centuries, she was the subject of works by painters such as Giorgio Vasari and Jacob Jordaens, and sculptors such as Gian Lorenzo Bernini and Pierre Julien.

== Etymology and origins ==
The etymology of Amáltheia (Ἀμάλθεια) is unknown. Scholars from the 19th century offered various hypotheses, among them derivations from álthō, althaínō (ἄλθω, ἀλθαίνω, 'to tend, to nourish') and amalḕ theía (ἀμαλὴ θεία, 'divine goat'). (Note: For lists of 19th-century proposals, see Gruppe, pp. 824–825 n. 9, and Roscher, p. 265. The two mentioned here are from Roscher; the second relies on the Iliad's use of amalḗ to describe lambs.) In 1917, Alfred Chilton Pearson described earlier etymologies as inadequate, suggesting that the name is related to amalós (ἀμαλός, 'soft, tender, weak') and amálē (ἀμάλη, 'sheaf, bundle'). (Note: Pearson, p. 60. For these translations, see Montanari, s.vv. ἀμάλη, ἀμαλλα, ἀμαλός, p. 101.) The verb amaltheúein (ἀμαλθεύειν, 'to nurture') (Note: Montanari, s.v. ἀμαλθεύω, p. 83.) was thought by Otto Gruppe, writing in 1906, to derive from Amalthea's name. According to Pearson, the two words should instead be understood as having existed alongside each other, with this notion of "abundance" being embodied in certain mythological figures. (Note: Pearson, p. 60. He writes that Gruppe's theory was refuted by the discovery of amaltheúein, previously attested only in later sources, in a fragment from the writings of the 5th-century BC tragedian Sophocles; Amalthea only appears as Zeus's nurturer in sources which date to after this period. For this fragment, see Sophocles, fr. 95 TrGF (Radt, p. 148) [= Photius, Lexicon s.v. Ἀμαλθεύειν (Reitzenstein, p. 86)].) In 1999, Gerard Mussies derived Amalthea's name from amalthḗs (ἀμαλθής, 'not softening'), which he saw as referring to the goat's udder, taut with milk.

There is no mention of Amalthea in Hesiod's Theogony, an 8th-century BC poem containing the earliest known account of Zeus's birth. Hesiod writes that the newborn Zeus is taken to a cave on "Mount Aigaion" on the island of Crete; (Note: Hard 2004, p. 74; Hesiod, Theogony 484 (Most, pp. 40–41). The translation used here is that from Hard.) some scholars interpret this as "Goat's Mountain" (aigós, αἰγός meaning "goat's"), and thus as related to the story of Amalthea. (Note: Willetts, p. 120; Astour, p. 314 n. 18; Hutchinson, pp. 201–202. On the meaning of aigós, see Montanari, s.v. αἴξ, p. 54.) Other scholars, including Martin Litchfield West, see no reason to view the name for the mountain as referring to a goat. According to Apostolos Athanassakis, elements of the story of Zeus's raising such as Amalthea and the Kouretes (male figures who dance loudly around the child in some versions) have their origins in traditions from Crete.

== Mythology ==
=== Horn of Amalthea ===
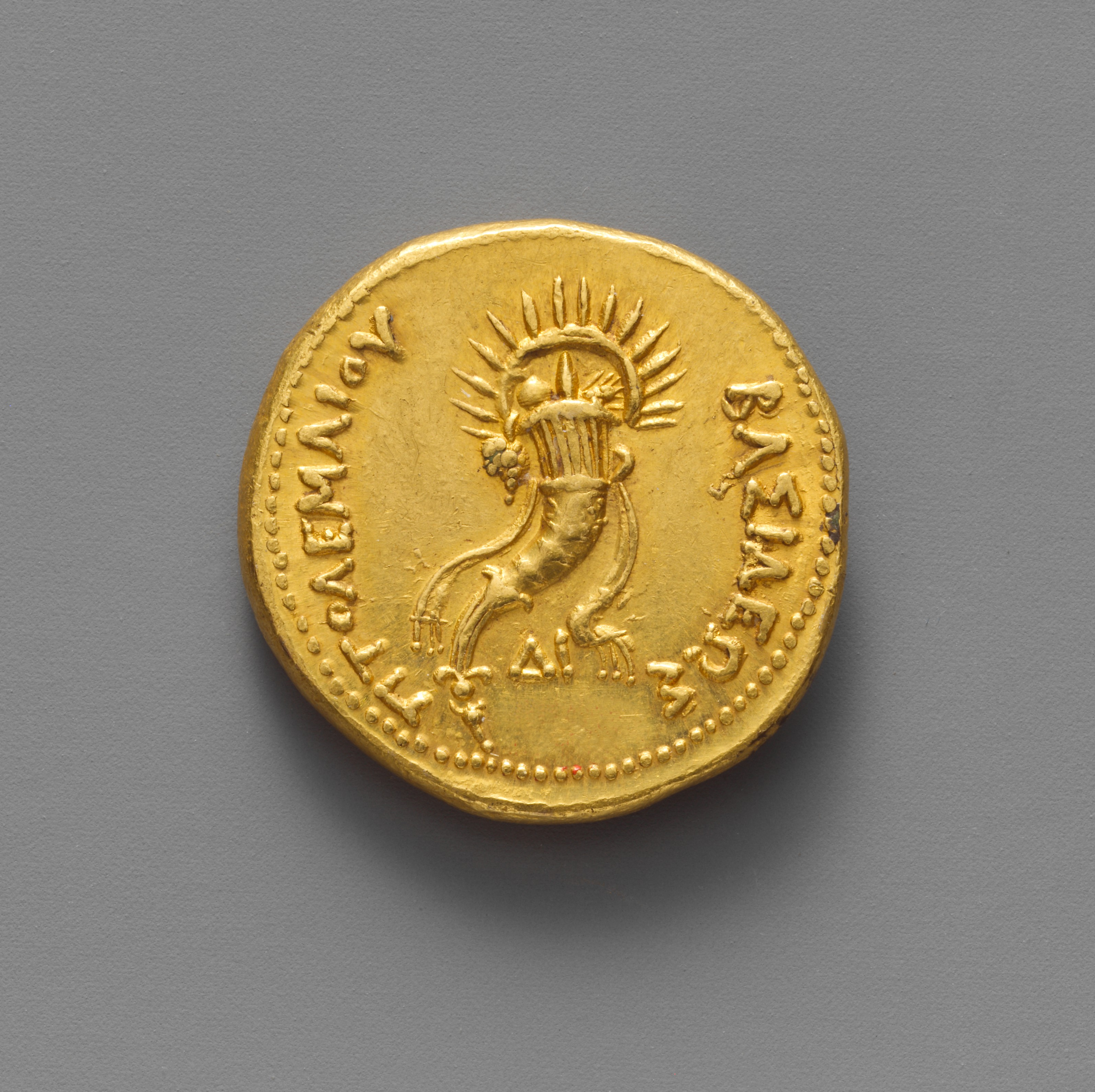
A cornucopia on a gold coin from Alexandria, Egypt, produced during the reign of Ptolemy IV Philopator (Note: Metropolitan Museum of Art 30.115.21.)

The "horn of Amalthea", later referred to in Latin literature as the cornucopia, is a magical horn generally described as being able to produce an inexhaustible supply of any food or drink desired. The tale of this horn seems to have originated as an independent tradition from that of Zeus's raising, though it is uncertain when the two merged. (Note: On the stories as initially independent, see: Miller, p. 223; Fowler 2013, pp. 323–324; Bremmer, para. 1; West 1983, p. 131. On the uncertainty as to when they were merged, see § Merging of traditions.) The "horn of Amalthea" is mentioned as early as the 6th century BC by poets such as Anacreon and Phocylides, (Note: Fowler 2013, p. 324; Gantz, p. 41; Anacreon, fr. 361 PMG (Page, p. 184); Phocylides, fr. 7 Gerber (pp. 396, 397). For Anacreon and Phocylides as dating to as early as the 6th century BC, see Robbins, "A. Life", para. 1, and Bowie, para. 1.) and is commonly referenced in comedies, such as those by Cratinus, Aristophanes, and Antiphanes (who date to the 5th or 4th century BC). (Note: Bremmer, para. 1; Fowler 2013, p. 324; Aristophanes, fr. 707 PCG (Kassel & Austin 1984, p. 362); Cratinus, fr. 261 PCG (Kassel & Austin 1983, p. 255); Antiphanes, fr. 108 PCG (Kassel & Austin 1991, p. 368).) The 4th-century BC comic poet Eubulus composed a now-lost work titled Amaltheia, which Richard L. Hunter believes may have dealt with the horn-owning Amalthea and represented her as an innkeeper.

According to the Bibliotheca – a 1st- or 2nd-century AD mythological compendium by an author referred to as "Apollodorus" – the 5th-century BC mythographer Pherecydes described the horn's ability to provide endless food and drink as desired. Apollodorus also transmits that it is considered to belong to Amalthea, a nymph (a type of young, female divinity). (Note: Fowler 2013, p. 323; Stephens, p. 64 on lines 48–49; Pherecydes, fr. 42 Fowler (2000, p. 303) [= FGrHist 3 F42 = Apollodorus, 2.7.5 (Frazer 1921, pp. 256–257)].) In a lost poem by the 5th-century BC poet Pindar, Heracles fought against the river god Achelous (who was in the form of a bull) for the hand of Deianeira, and during the fight Heracles pulled off one of his opponent's horns. Achelous reclaimed this horn from Heracles by trading it for a magical horn obtained from Amalthea, a daughter of Oceanus. (Note: Davies, pp. xii–xiii; Gantz, p. 28; Pindar, fr. 70b (249a) Maehler (p. 77) [= Scholia D on the Iliad, 21.194 (Dindorf, p. 218)].) In the same passage in which he cites Pherecydes, Apollodorus retells this story; he describes the nymph Amalthea as the daughter of Haemonius, whose name, meaning "Thessalian", indicates that she is separate from the nurse of Zeus. (Note: Fowler 2013, p. 323; Apollodorus, 2.7.5 (Frazer 1921, pp. 256–257). A mythical figure named Haemon is the father of Thessalus, who was thought to be the eponym of the region of Thessaly (Binder, para. 1).) In Apollodorus's account, Amalthea's horn is that of a bull (an element also mentioned by the 4th-to-3rd-century BC comic poet Philemon), (Note: Gantz, p. 42 (Apollodorus); Henig, p. 582 (Philemon); Apollodorus, 2.7.5 (Frazer 1921, pp. 256–257); Philemon, fr. 68 PCG (Kassel & Austin 1989, p. 261). According to Gantz, Apollodorus's source for this may be Pherecydes, whom he cites immediately afterwards.) seemingly a result of confusion with the bull's horn of Achelous. In the versions of the myth told by Diodorus Siculus (1st century BC) and Strabo (1st century BC/AD), the horn of Amalthea is identified with that of Achelous. (Note: Wernicke, para. 4; Diodorus Siculus, 4.35.3–4 (Oldfather 1935, pp. 456–457); Strabo, 10.2.19 (Jones 1928, pp. 56–57). For other versions of this myth, including those in which Amalthea is not mentioned, see Achelous § Heracles and Deianeira.)

=== Nurse of Zeus ===
In stories of Zeus's infancy, Amalthea is the figure most commonly described as his nurse, and in this role she is often considered a nymph. (Note: Grimal, s.v. Amalthea, p. 35, describes it as "most usual form of the story".) She appeared in the account of Zeus's upbringing from the now-lost Eumolpia, probably a theogony composed in or before the second half of the 4th century BC, and attributed in antiquity to the mythical poet Musaeus. (Note: West 1983, pp. 41–43, 132; Gantz, p. 41. West 1983, p. 5, suggests a date in the latter part of the 4th century BC, though Betegh, pp. 346–347, disagrees with West's assessment that the work was composed this late, and argues that content from the text was referenced by the 4th-century BC philosopher Eudemus of Rhodes.) This account is described in a summary – written by an author referred to as "Pseudo-Eratosthenes" – of the Catasterismi, a now-lost work of astral mythology attributed to the 3rd-to-2nd-century BC scholar Eratosthenes. (Note: Musaeus fr. 8 Diels (pp. 181–182) [= Eratosthenes, Catasterismi (Hard 2015, p. 44)]. On the Catasterismi and the summary by Pseudo-Eratosthenes, see Kanas, p. 109.) According to Pseudo-Eratosthenes, in the version by Musaeus, Zeus's mother Rhea gives him as a newborn to the goddess Themis; he is then handed over to the nymph Amalthea, who has the infant reared by a she-goat. This goat is said to be the offspring of the god Helios; she is so terrifying in appearance that, out of fear, the Titans (the gods from the generation before Zeus) had asked Gaia, their mother, to conceal her in a Cretan cave. Gaia complied, entrusting the goat to Amalthea. After Zeus reaches adulthood, he receives an oracle advising him to use the goat's skin as a weapon in his war against the Titans, because of its terrifying nature. The narrative from Musaeus is also recounted in De astronomia, (Note: Frazer 1929b, p. 12; Musaeus, fr. 84 III Bernabé (2007, p. 43) [= Hyginus, De astronomia 2.13.6–7 (Hard 2015, pp. 44–45)].) a work of astral mythology probably composed in the 2nd century AD. (Note: The work was attributed in antiquity to the Roman author Gaius Julius Hyginus; for this dating and attribution, see Hard 2004, p. 13.) De astronomia specifies that this goatskin used against the Titans is the aegis (a divine attribute which varies in form depending on the source). (Note: Gantz, p. 41. According to Gantz, this conclusion is "clearly intended" in Pseudo-Eratosthenes's account. On the aegis, see Parker, para. 1.)

Various accounts of Zeus's upbringing present Amalthea as a goat; these versions start appearing in the Hellenistic period (c. 323–30 BC). The earliest known author to describe her as a goat is the 3rd-century BC poet Callimachus, in his Hymn to Zeus. (Note: Hard 2004, pp. 75, 612. According to Gantz, p. 41, Callimachus "seems the first" to do so.) He relates that, after Zeus's birth, the god is taken by the Arcadian nymph Neda to a hidden location in Crete, where he is reared by the nymph Adrasteia and fed the milk of Amalthea. (Note: Boyd, p. 73; Callimachus, Hymn to Zeus 33–49 (Clayman, pp. 186–187).) In his description of Zeus's suckling of the breast of Amalthea, Callimachus employs the word mazón (μαζόν), which suggests the breast of a human rather than the teat of a goat; in doing so, Susan Stephens writes that Callimachus "calls attention to his own rationalizing variant of the myth". (Note: Stephens, p. 64 on lines 48–49. Kirichenko, p. 192, writes that Callimachus's account of Zeus's raising in Crete is "characterized by a complete elimination of the supernatural element", of which the transformation of the nymph Amalthea into a goat is one part.) According to a scholium on Callimachus's account (that is, a marginal note in a manuscript of his text), from one of Amalthea's horns flows ambrosia and from the other comes nectar (the food and drink of the gods, respectively). (Note: Campbell, p. 322; Miller, p. 223; Hansen, p. 325; Scholia on Callimachus's Hymn to Zeus, 49 (Miller, p. 223 n. 9).) In the version of Zeus's infancy from Diodorus Siculus, the child is reared by nymphs on the milk of the goat Amalthea, as well as honey; (Note: Larson, p. 185; Diodorus Siculus, 5.70.2–3 (Oldfather 1939, pp. 284–287).) Diodorus Siculus adds that Amalthea is the source of Zeus's epithet aigíokhos (αἰγίοχος, 'aegis-bearing'). (Note: Farnell, p. 97; Diodorus Siculus, 5.70.6 (Oldfather 1939, pp. 286–289). For this translation, see Oldfather 1939, p. 289 n. 1.) An account which is largely the same as that given by Pseudo-Eratosthenes is found in a scholium on the Iliad, though the scholiast (the scholium's author) describes Amalthea herself as the goat which terrifies the Titans. (Note: Gantz, p. 41; Scholia D on the Iliad, 15.229 (Dindorf, p. 72). This version specifies that it is Themis who provides the oracle directing Zeus to use the goat's skin. Part of the scholium's account also seems to have been preserved in P. Oxy. 3003 col. ii.15–19 (Parsons, p. 17); see Parsons, p. 19.)

In works of astral mythology, the tale of the goat who nurses the young Zeus is adapted to provide an aition (or origin myth) for certain stars. The 3rd-century BC poet Aratus, in his description of the constellation of the Charioteer (Auriga), explains that the star of the Goat (Capella) sits on the Charioteer's left shoulder. (Note: Kidd, p. 239; Aratus, Phaenomena 155–161 (Mair & Mair, pp. 218–219). For the modern names of the constellation and star, see Mair & Mair's note g and note h.) He identifies this goat with Amalthea, describing it as the goat who suckled Zeus; (Note: Hard 2015, pp. 46–47; Aratus, Phaenomena 163 (Mair & Mair, pp. 218–219).) in this passage, he employs the word mazón for the goat's breast, similarly to Callimachus, who may be his source for this information. He also refers to her as the "Olenian" goat, which may be an allusion to a version in which Zeus is reared (by a goat) near the Achaean city of Olenos, or to the location of the star on the arm (ōlénē, ὠλένη) of the Charioteer. (Note: Hard 2015, p. 47 (calls her Olenian, interpretations); Mair & Mair, p. 221 n. a (interpretations); Aratus, Phaenomena 164 (Mair & Mair, pp. 218–221). For the first interpretation, see Strabo, 8.7.5 (Jones 1927, pp. 222–223).) Alternatively, it may indicate that the goat's father is Olenus (the son of Hephaestus), an interpretation given by a scholium on the passage. (Note: Henig, p. 582; Scholia on Aratus, 164 (Kidd, p. 243 on line 164). Fowler 2013, p. 323 n. 212, compares this with Hyginus, De astronomia 2.13.5 (Hard 2015, p. 44), in which Aix and Helice, nurses of Zeus, are daughters of Olenus. For a more detailed discussions of possible explanations for this word, see Bömer, pp. 298–299 on line 113, Frazer 1929b, pp. 11–12, and Boyd, p. 73 with n. 28.) At the end of the account given by Pseudo-Eratosthenes, the text contains a lacuna (or gap), where it has been proposed that Zeus was described as placing the goat among the stars. Emma Gee believes that in the Catasterismi the god would have performed this action for the goat's role in his defeat of the Titans, and her nursing of him during his youth.

=== Merging of traditions ===
According to Robert Fowler, the nursing of Zeus by a goat and the originally independent tradition of the magical horn had become "entangled" by the time of Pherecydes. Jan N. Bremmer writes that the Roman poet Ovid (active around the beginning of the 1st century AD) was the first to bring the two tales together. In Ovid's account, presented in his Fasti, (Note: Ovid, Fasti 5.111–128 (Boyle & Woodard, pp. 116–117).) Amalthea is once again the goat's owner, and is a naiad (or water nymph) who lives on Mount Ida. She hides the young Zeus in Crete (away from his father, Cronus), where he is suckled by the she-goat. On one occasion, the goat snaps off one of its horns on a tree, and Amalthea, filling the broken horn with fruit, brings it back to Zeus; this tale, an aition for the cornucopia, appears to be the earliest attempt at providing an origin for the object. Zeus later places the goat (and perhaps her broken-off horn) in the heavens, the goat becoming the star Capella. (Note: Gee, p. 131 with n. 17 (placed in heavens); Boyle & Woodard, pp. 258 on lines 1.111–114, 259 on lines 5.127–128 (as Capella). According to Boyle & Woodard, Ovid may have considered Capricornus ('Goat's Horn') to be the constellation into which the horn is transformed.) Ovid's narrative brings together elements from multiple earlier accounts, which he intertwines in an episode characterised by John F. Miller as a "miniature masterpiece". His source for the narrative's overall outline appears to be Eratosthenes: he describes Amalthea as a nymph, and seemingly alludes to Zeus's war with the Titans. He notably departs from the Eratosthenic story by describing the goat as 'beautiful' (formosa) and as having majestic horns. Ovid harks back to Aratus in the first words of his narrative, which mirror the opening phrase of Aratus's poem, (Note: The initial phrase of Ovid's narrative (line 5.111) is ab Iove surgat opus, translated as "let the work rise from Jove" by Boyle & Woodard, p. 116; Aratus begins with ἐκ Διὸς ἀρχώμεσθα, translated as "let us begin from Zeus" by Miller (Miller, p. 221).) and by describing the goat as "Olenian". (Note: Miller, pp. 221–222. Miller also points to Ovid's choice to describe the goat as having two kids, which hints at the constellation of the Kids, mentioned by Aratus as sitting beside that of the goat (and as her offspring).) Barbara Boyd also sees in Ovid's narrative considerable influence from the Callimachean account of Zeus's infancy. (Note: Boyd, p. 72. According to Boyd, Ovid "makes Callimachus both the primary model and the focus of his narrative". Miller, p. 218, argues that Boyd "downplays the extent of Ovid's engagement with Aratus here, and correspondingly somewhat overemphasizes the admittedly important Callimachean background".)

Miller points to a garbled scholium on Aratus's account as evidence that the story of Zeus's upbringing and that of Amalthea's magical horn may have already been connected by the time of Ovid. (Note: Miller, p. 223; Scholia on Aratus, 156 (Jean Martin, pp. 158–159).) Two variants appear to be mixed in this scholium: Zeus's nurse is an Arcadian woman in the first, and a goat in the second. The scholiast describes the horn of this nurse as Amalthea's horn, which he associates with the constellation of the Goat; Amalthea's horn would seem here to be the magical horn of plenty, though the two are not explicitly identified. (Note: Gee, p. 134 with n. 27. According to Gee, "we can surmise this from our knowledge of the tradition recorded by Pherecydes".) Miller also points, as possible further evidence of a tradition in which the two tales were connected, to the scholiast on Callimachus, whose mention of ambrosia and nectar flowing from the goat's horns may have been related to the young Zeus's nourishment.

=== Later versions ===
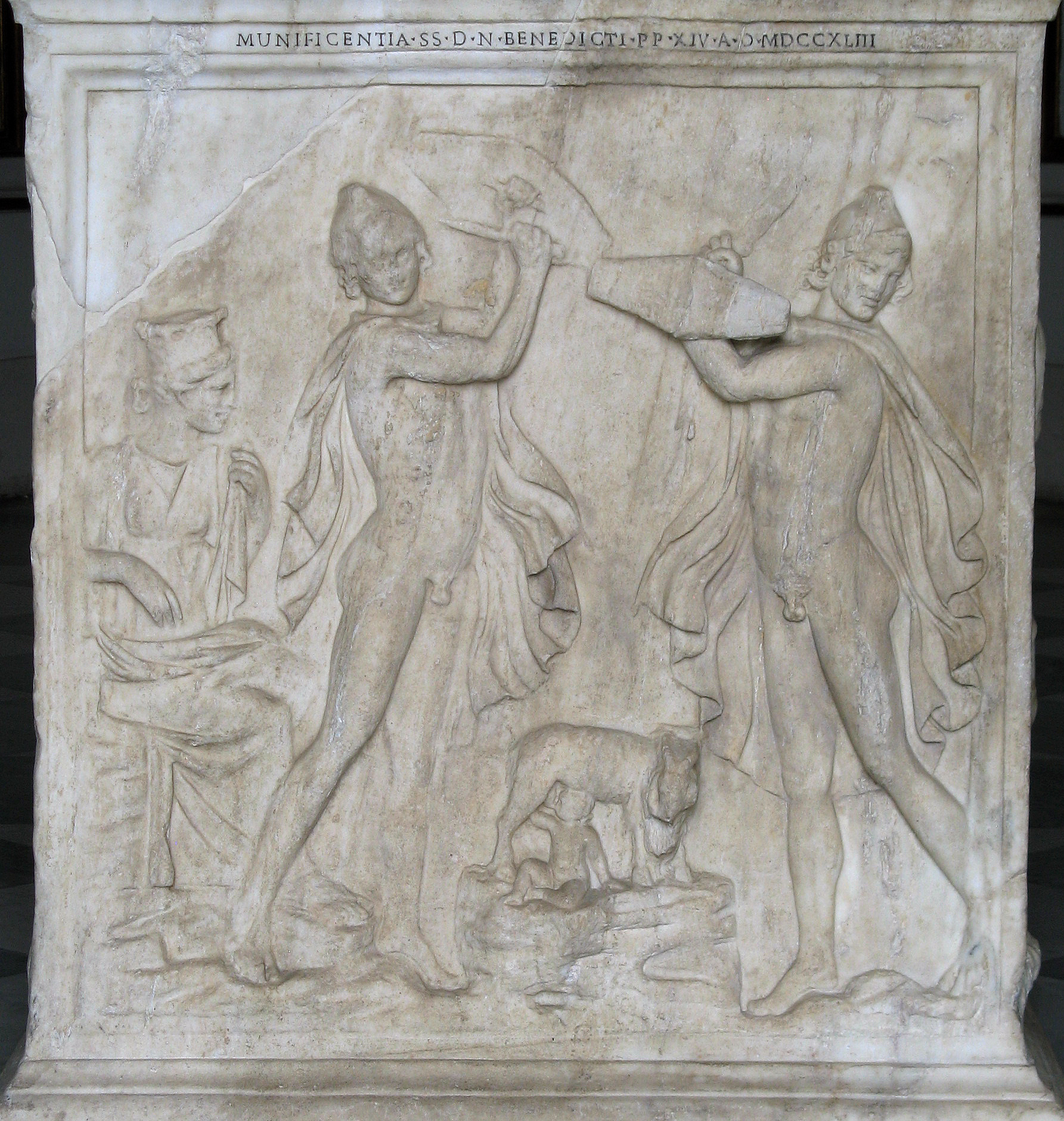
The goat Amalthea suckles the infant Zeus, behind two Kouretes who dance raucously. Marble relief from the 2nd century AD, Capitoline Museum. (Note: Henig, p. 583; Digital LIMC 1942 (Amaltheia 6). For the figures in this relief as Kouretes, see Buddensieg, p. 129.)

An account of Zeus's infancy appears in the Fabulae, a mythological handbook which has been attributed to Gaius Julius Hyginus and was probably composed in the 2nd century AD. (Note: Hyginus, Fabulae 139 (Smith & Trzaskoma, p. 146; Marshall, pp. 122–123). Most scholars now consider this attribution spurious; on the work's date and attribution, see Hard 2004, p. 13.) In this version, unlike in Hesiod's Theogony, (Note: In the Theogony, Cronus, one of the Titans, swallows the first five of his children – Hestia, Demeter, Hera, Hades, and Poseidon – upon the birth of each. Because of this, their mother Rhea gives Cronus a stone to swallow in place of their sixth child, Zeus (Hard 2004, pp. 67–68).) Zeus's elder siblings (or some of them) are not swallowed, though Rhea still gives Cronus a stone in place of Zeus, which he consumes. (Note: Gantz, p. 42. In the Fabulae, instead of being swallowed, Poseidon is thrown by Cronus into the ocean, and Hades is cast by him into the underworld. Hera is not swallowed either, as she transports the newborn Zeus.) Upon realising the deception, Cronus scours the earth for his son, while Zeus's sister Hera carries the infant to Crete, where she entrusts him to Amalthea, a nymph in this account. (Note: This is the interpretation of Henig, p. 582.) To keep Zeus from his father, Amalthea hides him in a cradle, which she places in a tree, so that he "could not be found in the sky, on earth, or on the sea". (Note: Hard 2004, p. 75; Kerényi, pp. 93–94; Henig, p. 582. The quoted translation is that given by Smith & Trzaskoma, p. 146.) To prevent Cronus from hearing the child's cries, Amalthea gathers the Kouretes and supplies them with shields and spears, which she instructs them to clang noisily around the child. (Note: Kerényi, p. 94. The Kouretes (also referred to as the Corybantes) are included in accounts of Zeus's infancy from as early as Callimachus, and are commonly described as performing their clangorous dance around the entrance to the cave in which the infant is nursed (Hard 2004, p. 75).) According to Martin Nilsson, this account is not fully a creation of the poet, and probably has some basis in a connection between the young Zeus and tree worship. Later in the work, Hyginus mentions Althaea, (Note: Hyginus, Fabulae 182 (Smith & Trzaskoma, p. 158; Marshall, p. 152). Marshall gives the names of the three daughters as Idyia, Althaea, and Adrasta.) who has been interpreted as Amalthea; (Note: See, for example, West 1983, p. 133 n. 40, and Smith & Trzaskoma, p. 191 on line 182.) he calls this figure one of the daughters of Ocean (that is, the Titan Oceanus), (Note: This is the interpretation of Fowler 2013, p. 323.) alongside Adrasteia and Ida. He adds that these three are alternatively considered daughters of Melisseus, the mythical king of Crete, and nurses of Zeus. (Note: Fowler 2013, p. 323 n. 212; Frey, para. 1. Hyginus also states that these three are "the ones that are called Dodonian Nymphs (others call them the Naiads)" (Smith & Trzaskoma, p. 158).)

Other versions of Zeus's upbringing also describe Amalthea as related to Melisseus. (Note: On this figure, see Frey, para. 1.) In the account given by the late-1st-century BC writer Didymus, the infant Zeus is raised by the nymphs Amalthea and Melissa, the daughters of Melisseus, who feed him honey and the milk of a goat. (Note: Frey, para. 1; Braswell, p. 158; Didymus on Pindar, fr. 14b Braswell (pp. 155–157)] [= Lactantius, Divine Institutes (Bowen & Garnsey, p. 114)].) In Apollodorus's version of Zeus's infancy, the god is born in a cave on Mount Dicte in Crete, where he is fed the milk of Amalthea. He is raised by the nymphs Adrasteia and Ida, the daughters of Melisseus, and protected by the Kouretes, who noisily clang their spears and shields. (Note: West 1983, pp. 122–123; Apollodorus, 1.1.6–7 (Frazer 1921, pp. 6–7).)

Amalthea also seems to have appeared in the now-lost Orphic Rhapsodies, a 1st-century BC or 1st-century AD theogony attributed to the mythical poet Orpheus in antiquity. (Note: On the Orphic Rhapsodies, see Graf, para. 2. For this dating, see Meisner, p. 1.) Luc Brisson and West believe that in the poem Amalthea was the wife of Melisseus (a detail transmitted by the 5th-century AD Neoplatonist philosopher Hermias) (Note: On Hermias's mention of this detail, see: West 1983, p. 133 n. 37; Orphic frr. 209 I Bernabé (2004, pp. 181–182), 209 II Bernabé (2004, pp. 182–183).) and that her daughters by him, the nymphs Adrasteia and Ida, raised Zeus in the cave of the goddess Night while the Kouretes guarded its entrance. According to the reconstruction of the poem by Alberto Bernabé, Zeus was raised by the nymphs Adrasteia and Ida (still the daughters of Melisseus) and fed the milk of Amalthea, whom Bernabé describes as a "goat-nymph". (Note: Bernabé 2008, p. 315. Compare with Meisner, p. 219, who states that in the Rhapsodies Zeus is "nursed by a triad of nymphs: Ida, Adrasteia, and Amaltheia".) An Orphic work may have been the source for the version of Zeus's upbringing told by Apollodorus.

Diodorus Siculus, in a euhemerist reworking of Amalthea's myth, describes her as an especially beautiful young woman and the lover of Ammon, who is the king of Libya. Ammon gives her a region of great fertility which is shaped like a bull's horn, and which, taking its name from her, comes to be known as "Amalthea's horn". (Note: Smith, s.v. Amalthea; Diodorus Siculus, 3.68.1 (Oldfather 1935, pp. 308–309).) Diodorus Siculus adds that this name is thus used by later generations to refer to any exceptionally fertile and fruitful piece of land. (Note: Sauron 2007, p. 42. An example of a location referred to as "Amalthea's horn" was a spot in a well-watered grove belonging to the Sicilian tyrant Gelon, who lived around the early 5th century BC. This location is mentioned by Athenaeus, Deipnosophistae 12.542a (Olson, pp. 152–153).) In this version, Amalthea and Ammon are also the parents of the god Dionysus. (Note: Winiarczyk, p. 127; Diodorus Siculus, 3.74.1 (Oldfather 1935, pp. 328–329).) The location of Amalthea's rearing of Zeus was evoked in the 1st century BC by an Amaltheum belonging to Atticus, a friend of the Roman statesman Cicero. (Note: Sinn, p. 207; Sauron 1991, p. 9; Sauron 2007, p. 42.) The form of this Amaltheum is unknown, although Gilles Sauron believes that it included a cave and a gallery housing portraits of distinguished Romans. (Note: Sauron 1991, pp. 5–6. On the various proposals made up to 1906 regarding the Amaltheum's form, see Moore, pp. 122–123.) In the version of the myth from the 2nd-century AD Greek writer Zenobius, when Zeus places the goat from his childhood among the stars, he sets aside one of her horns, which he gives to the nymphs who raised him, imbuing it with its magical abilities. (Note: Bremmer, para. 1; Mussies, "II. Identity", para. 2; Zenobius, 2.48 (Schneidewin, pp. 44–45).) De astronomia, which presents an account of the goat Amalthea's nursing of Jupiter (the equivalent of Zeus in Latin literature), (Note: Hyginus, De astronomia 2.13.5 (Hard 2015, p. 44). On Jupiter as the equivalent of Zeus in Latin literature, see Hard 2004, p. xvi.) later states that Amalthea also raises Aegipan, a figure who is in some sources indistinct from the rustic god Pan. (Note: Vian, p. 309; Hyginus, De astronomia 2.28.1 (Hard 2015, p. 79). On Aegipan, see Tripp, s.v. Aegipan, p. 20.) Nonnus, a 5th-century AD Greek writer, describes Pan as the shepherd of the goat Amalthea. (Note: Vian, p. 309; Nonnus, Dionysiaca 27.298 (Rouse, pp. 340–341).)

== In art ==
=== Ancient ===
Amalthea's extant iconography in ancient Greek and Roman art is limited. She is represented either as a nymph or a goat, the latter the more common form. (Note: Henig, pp. 582–583; Preimesberger, p. 60. According to Henig, some works identified as depictions of the goat Amalthea may instead represent the goat she owns.) On a Campana relief (a type of Roman terracotta relief) dating to the late 1st century BC or early 1st century AD, she is shown nursing Zeus (who sits in her lap) without the presence of a goat; two Kouretes carry swords and shields, one on each side of her. (Note: Henig, pp. 582–583 (type and date of relief, nursing, Kouretes); Buddensieg, pp. 128–129 with n. 19 (in lap, without a goat); Digital LIMC 45699 (Amaltheia 2). On Campana reliefs, see Stone, p. 148.) As a goat, Amalthea is often shown suckling Zeus, or with the child mounted upon her back. A 2nd-century AD marble relief depicts her as a goat giving the child her milk, behind two dancing Kouretes who clang their swords on their shields. Amalthea is also depicted on coins and medallions from the Roman Empire, including those from the reigns of Titus (79–81 AD) and Gallienus (253–268 AD). Coins from Crete and Anatolia (modern-day Turkey) portray her as a nymph holding Zeus, sometimes with a cornucopia present.

=== Modern ===
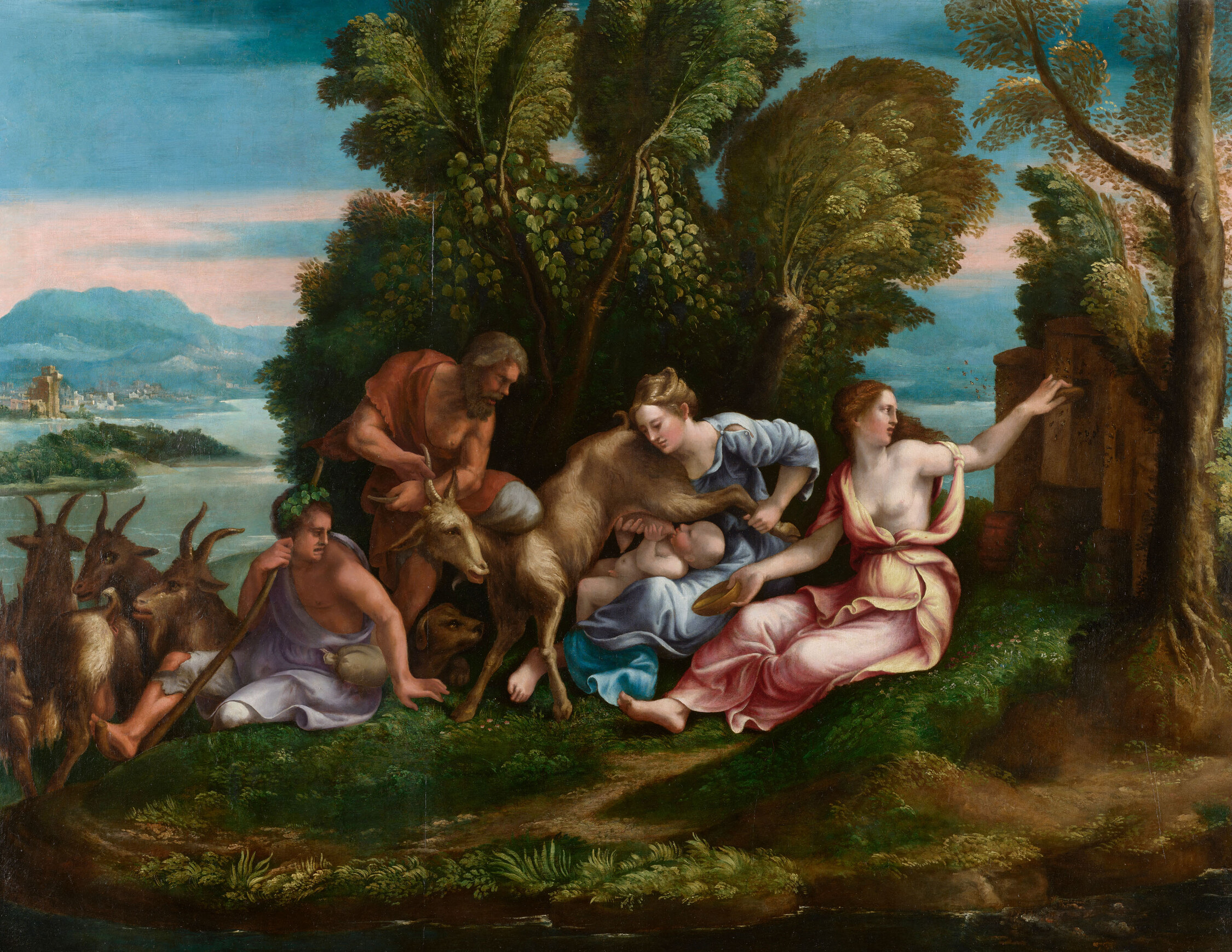
Giulio Romano's The Nurture of Jupiter (created shortly after 1533) (Note: Meredith Martin, p. 57; Royal Collection 402781. The date used here is that from Martin.)

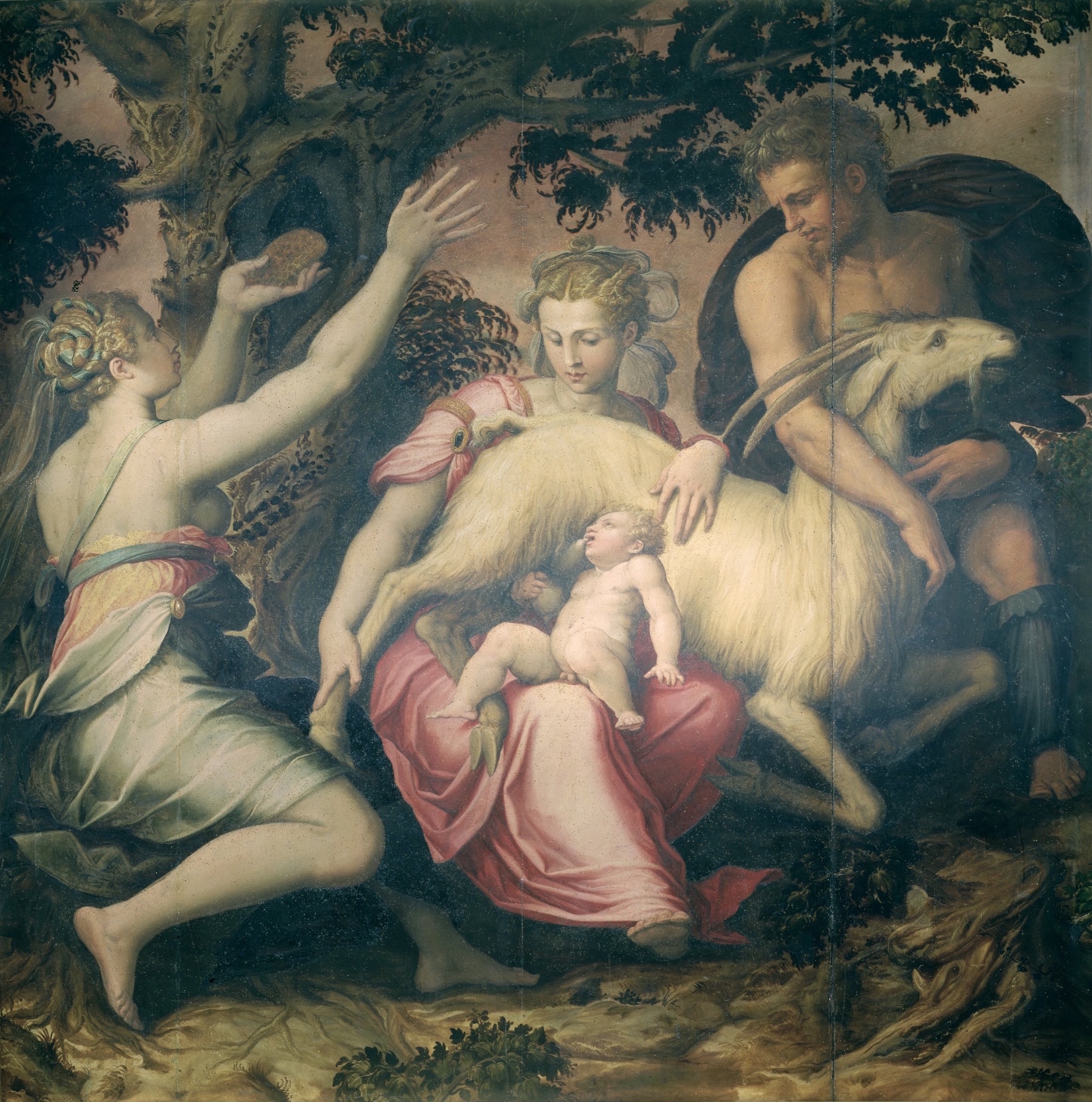
Giorgio Vasari's The Infancy of Jupiter (1555–1556)

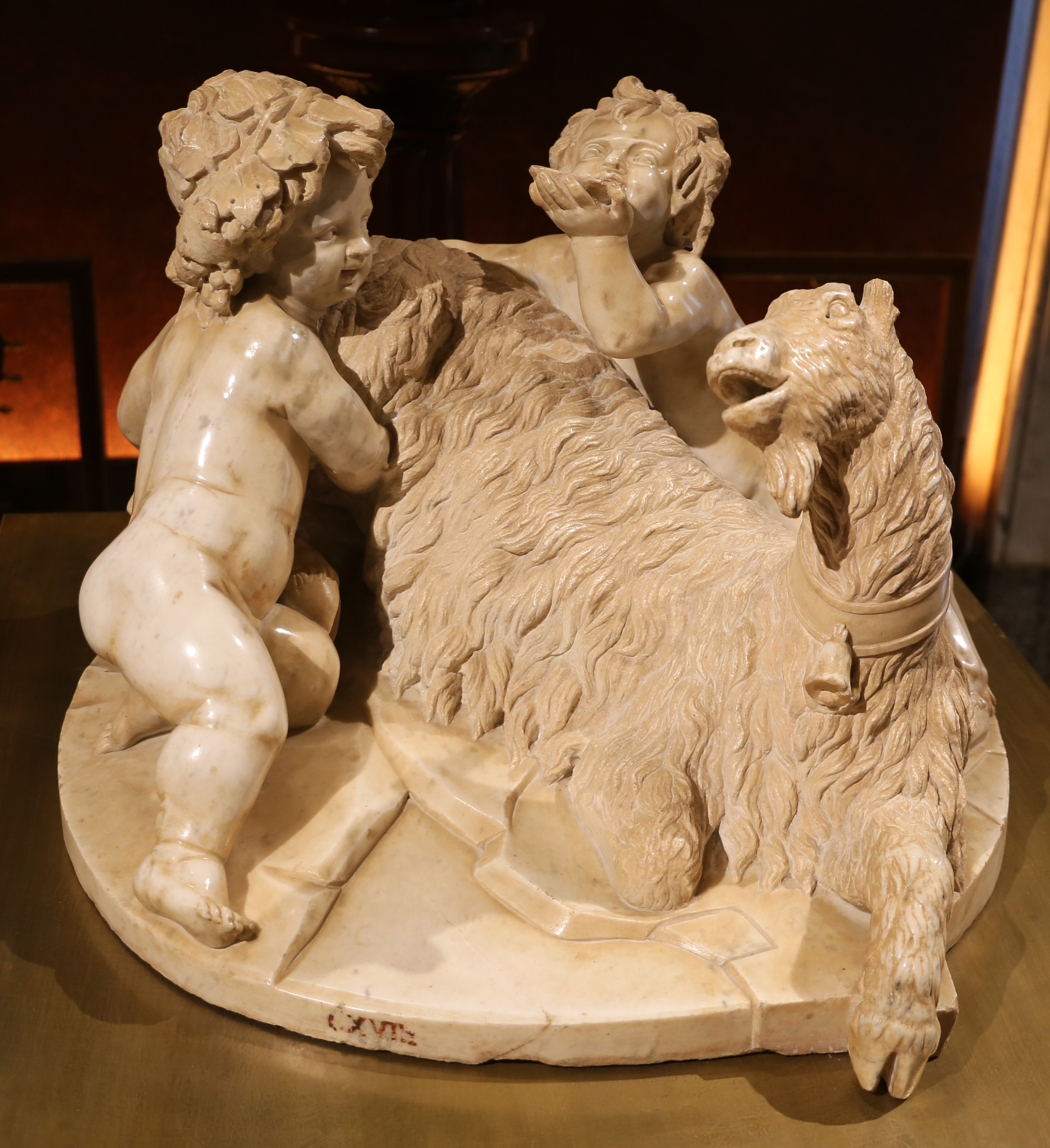
Gian Lorenzo Bernini's The Goat Amalthea with the Infant Jupiter and a Faun (before 1615) (Note: Preimesberger, p. 53; Galleria Borghese CXVIII.)

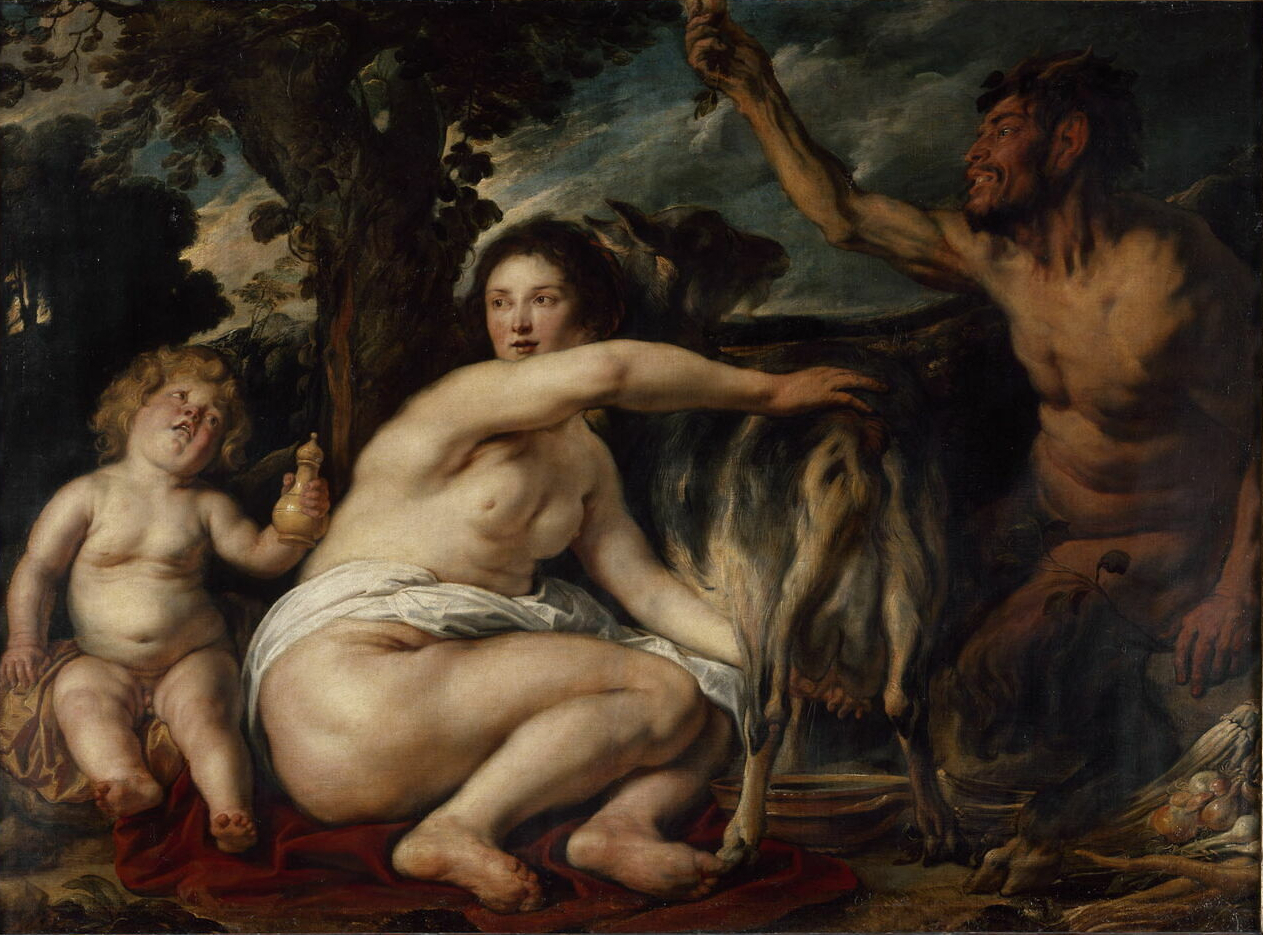
Jacob Jordaens's The Infant Jupiter Fed by the Goat Amalthea (c. 1630–1635) (Note: d'Hulst, p. 148; Louvre 1405. The date given here is the one from d'Hulst.)

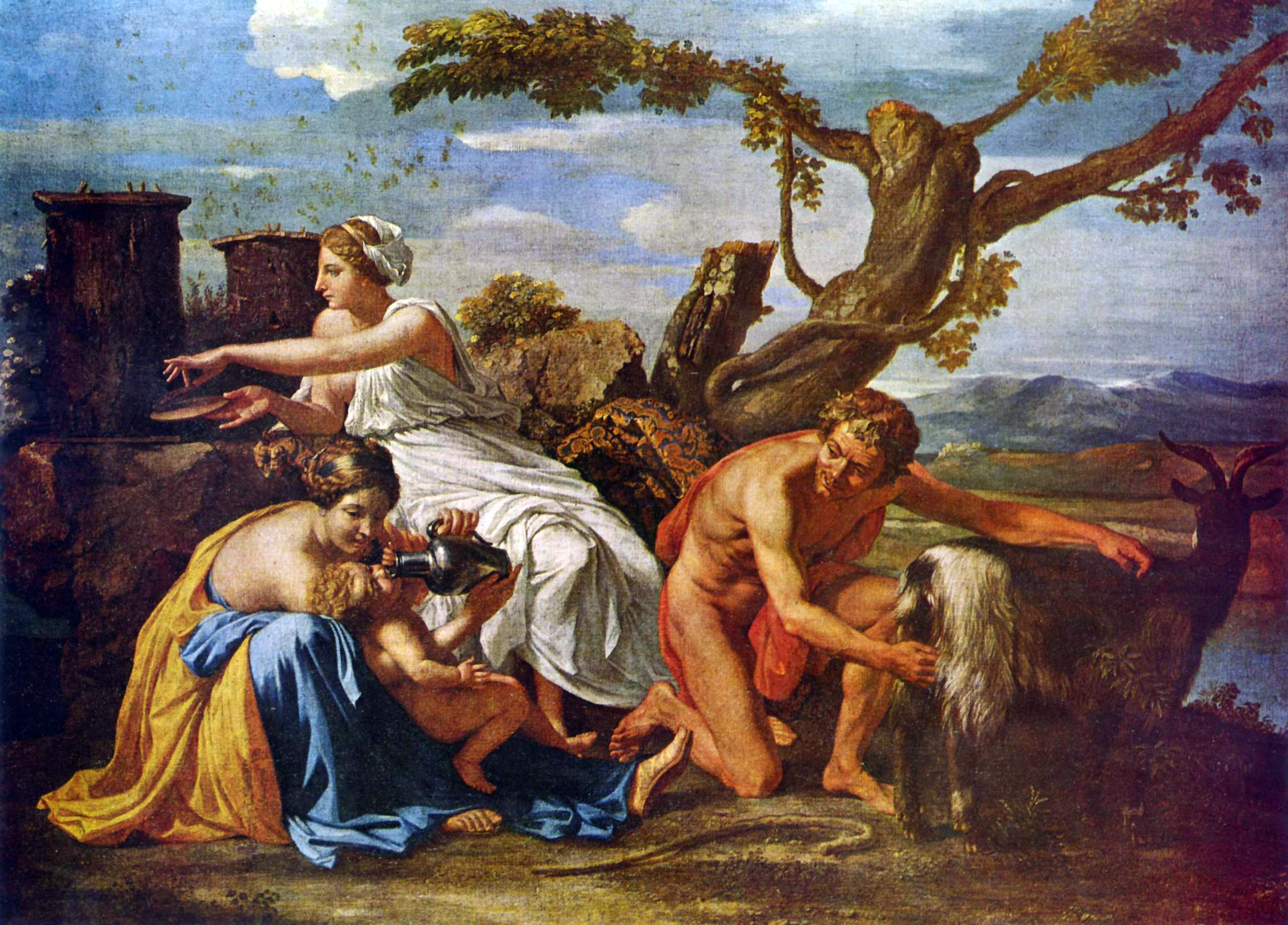
Nicolas Poussin's The Nurture of Jupiter (c. 1639) (Note: Verdi, p. 208; Staatliche Museen zu Berlin DPG234. The date given here is that from Verdi.)

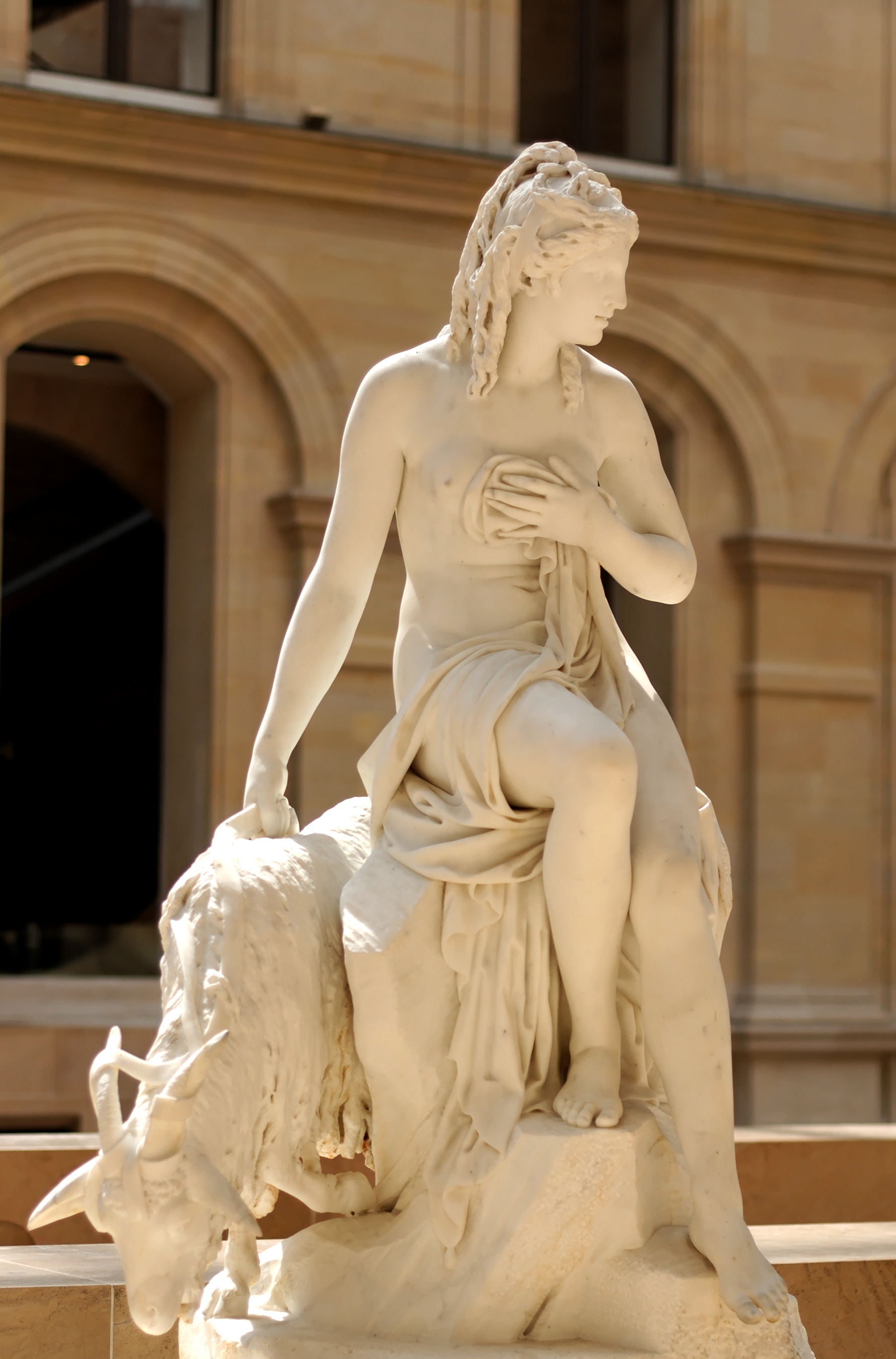
Pierre Julien's Young Woman with a Goat, or Amalthea (completed in 1787) (Note: Draper & Scherf, pp. 185–186; Louvre CC 230. The date given here is the one from Draper & Scherf.)

Amalthea was represented as a goat by the Italian artist Giulio Romano, in a painting executed shortly after 1533 as part of a series of twelve works illustrating scenes from Jupiter's upbringing. (Note: Meredith Martin, p. 57. On Amalthea as a goat in this painting, see Hartt, p. 212.) She is shown with her rear end raised in the air by a nymph, below which the child drinks from her teats. (Note: Bull, p. 143. For a nymph as the one who raises her legs, see Hartt, p. 212.) A painting of Amalthea as a nymph, executed by the Italian artist Giorgio Vasari in 1555 or 1556, was afforded a central position in the Sala di Giove ('Room of Jupiter') of the Palazzo Vecchio, located in Florence. (Note: Preimesberger, pp. 62–63. For this date, see Van Veen, p. 23. This article follows Preimesberger in identifying Amalthea as one of the nymphs; Van Veen, p. 22 describes her as a "goat/nymph" in the painting.) In his own writings, Vasari explains the work's meaning: the child Jupiter, who represents Cosimo I de' Medici (the Duke of Florence and the building's owner), receives foresight from the goat milk fed to him by Amalthea and wisdom from the honey provided by the nymph Melissa.

Amalthea was the subject of a sculpture attributed to the Baroque sculptor Gian Lorenzo Bernini, among his first works, produced before 1615 (in which year he turned 17). (Note: Zirpolo, p. 90; Preimesberger, pp. 53, 59. For Bernini's birth year as 1598, see Hibbard, p. 23.) It depicts Amalthea as a goat, with the infant Jupiter drinking her milk, accompanied by a miniature satyr; it diverges from the ancient artistic tradition by having Jupiter feed himself. The realistic carving of the statue's surface is reminiscent of that of Hellenistic sculptures, and until recent times it was thought to have been produced in antiquity. (Note: Zirpolo, p. 90; Hibbard, p. 25. Wittkower, p. 110, writing in 1975, said that this belief was held "until a generation ago".) It was under the ownership of the cardinal Scipione Borghese by 1615, and may have been seen as containing a political meaning: Amalthea, embodying abundance, may have symbolised the "Golden Age" ushered in under the papacy of Pope Paul V (who was also part of the Borghese family).

The myth of the goat Amalthea was a favourite subject of the Flemish painter Jacob Jordaens. Around 1630 to 1635, he created a painting in which Amalthea is being milked by Adrasteia beside a young, bawling Jupiter, bottle in hand. A print after this painting by the Frisian engraver Schelte a Bolswert is accompanied by a Latin inscription which presents a moral interpretation of the myth: it explains that Jupiter's adulterous proclivities are unsurprising given he was raised amongst satyrs, on the milk of a goat. (Note: Preimesberger, pp. 64–65. For an image of the engraving, see File:Jupiter als kind gevoed met melk van de geit Amalthea, RP-P-BI-2610.jpg.) Jordaens's other paintings of Amalthea include elements such as a satyr playing a flute or tambourine, and a nymph holding a milk pitcher while looking at the audience. Around 1636 to 1637, the French painter Nicolas Poussin created a painting of the myth of Amalthea inspired by an engraving (after Romano's painting) by the 16th-century Italian artist Giulio Bonasone. Poussin's second painting of the scene, dating to around 1639, portrays Amalthea as a woman holding a valuable receptacle containing goat's milk, from which the child drinks.

In 1787, the French sculptor Pierre Julien completed a white marble statue depicting Amalthea as a nymph, seated on a rock, with her hand grasping the lead of her goat. Julien's Amalthea is a young, nude woman endowed with full hips, her pose echoing the Venus de' Medici. (Note: Draper & Scherf, p. 186. For the statue's subject as nude, see Meredith Martin, p. 227.) The sculpture was the central element of the dairy at Rambouillet, which Louis XVI had commissioned for his wife Marie Antoinette. Installed in 1787, the statue was situated in a grotto within the building, a placement Meredith Martin sees as indicating that the dairy was an allusion to the cave from the myth of Jupiter's upbringing; (Note: Meredith Martin, pp. 227, 236. For the date of the statue's installation, see Scherf, p. 126.) this grotto included artificial rocks, flowing water, and a skylight. (Note: Lavagne, p. 265. For images of the sculpture while placed in the grotto, see Heitzmann, p. 51 fig. 11–12.) Along the walls of the room that contained the grotto were two friezes, one of which depicted Amalthea as a goat, nursing Jupiter.

== See also ==
- Heiðrún, cosmic goat in Norse mythology
- Human–animal breastfeeding
