= Anchiale =

Historic city of ancient Cilicia

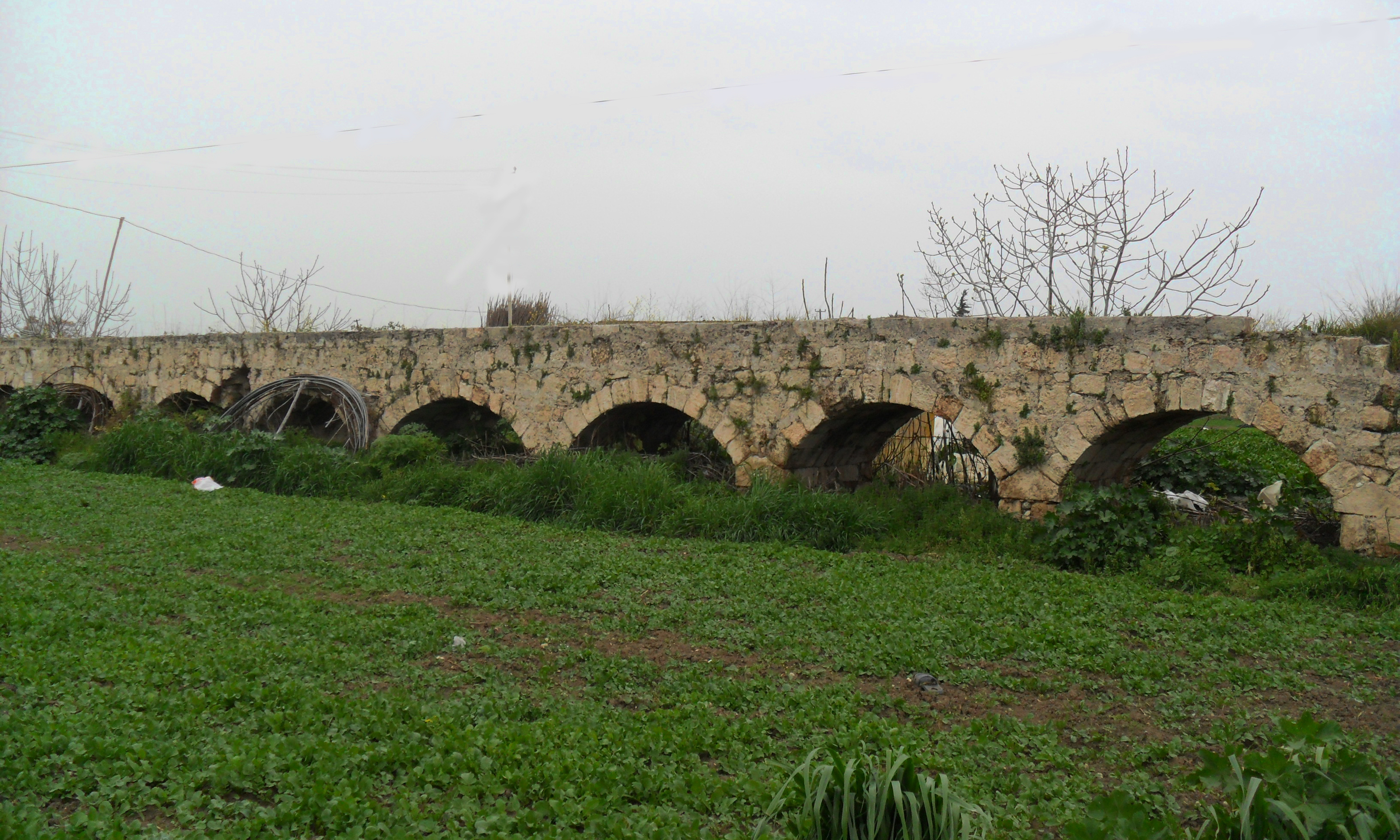
Karaduvar aqueduct in Mersin, Turkey

Anchiale (Ancient Greek: Ἀγχιάλη) or Anchialeia was a historic city of ancient Cilicia now a part of modern Mersin, Turkey. It was inhabited during the Hellenistic, Roman, and Byzantine eras.

== History ==
The main informant about Anchiale was Strabo. According to Strabo the city had been constructed by Sardanapalus, the last king of Assyria. Strabo further claims that Sardanapalus' tomb is in Anchiale. The city was conquered by Alexander the Great just before the battle of Issus.

== Mythology ==
Some mythology traditions posit an eponymous ruler with the same name founded the city.

== Geography ==
The exact location of Anchiale is debatable. Like most historians British captain Francis Beaufort identifies Anchiale with Karaduvar, now a neighbourhood of Mersin at 36°48′35″N 34°41′58″E. But he adds that the amount of ruins in Karaduvar is too few for an important ancient city.

== Ruins ==
As Beaufort points out there are only a few ruins. There are a tumulus, several house ruins and an aqueduct from the original city. Bath mosaic is from Roman times.
