= Epidamnus (mythology) =

In Greek mythology, Epidamnus (Ancient Greek: Ἐπίδαμνος Epídamnos) father of Melissa who became the mother of Dyrrhachius by the sea-god Poseidon. The town of Dyrrhachium in Illyria which was formerly called Epidamnus derived its name from him.
