= Hecaterus =

Mythical character

In Greek mythology, Hecaterus or Hekateros (Ancient Greek: Ἑκάτερος) was a minor god and the father of five daughters (the Hecaterides) by the daughter of Phoroneus, and through them grandfather of the Oreads, Satyrs, and Curetes. His wife was also identified as Anchiale, the mother of a set of sons (the Dactyls).

His name has been interpreted as referring to the hekateris (ἑκατερίς, a rustic dance which involves quickly moving hands), and he has been interpreted as a patron or personification of this dance. On the other hand, it has been suggested that the name "Hekateros" (which stands in the genitive case Ἑκατέρου in the original Greek text) could result from corruption of the purported ἑκ Δώρου "of Dorus".
