= Oaxes =

In Greek mythology, Oaxes or Oaxos or Oaxus (Ancient Greek: Ὄαξος) was the founder of the town of Oaxus within Crete, a place known to Servius and Herodotus. He was the son of the god Apollo either by the Cretan nymph Anchiale or Acacallis, daughter of Minos. Apollonius wrote in Argonautica of Crete being the Oaxian land. Vibius Sequester wrote the river Oaxes gave its name (to the city Oaxia). The river Oaxes was, according to Baudrand, very cold.
