= Anchiale (mythology) =

Name in Greek mythology

In Greek mythology, Anchiale or Ankhiale (Ancient Greek: Ἀγχιάλη) was the name of the following personages:

- Anchiale, said to have founded the town of Anchiale near Tarsus in Cilicia. Her father was named Iapetus, and she had a son named Cydnus.
- Anchiale, a Cretan nymph, who gave birth to the metalworking Idaean Dactyls in the Dictaean cave. She was also seen as a Titan goddess and perhaps represented the warmth of fire. She was the wife of Hecaterus.
- Anchiale, according to Servius, was the mother of Oaxes by Apollo.
