= Ida (mythology) =

The name Ida is the name of several mythological figures.

== Greek mythology ==
In Greek mythology Ida or Ide (Ancient Greek: 'timber' or 'woodland'), may refer to the following:

- Ida, daughter of Corybas and mother of Minos.
- Ida, one of the nurses of Zeus.

== Hindu mythology ==
In Hindu mythology Ida is goddess of speech. Ilā-Idā is also associated with Sarasvati, the goddess of knowledge.

== Norse mythology ==
In Norse mythology, the Iðavöllr (Plains of Ida) are the plains that surround Asgard, the home of the Æsir gods.
