= Theisoa (nymph) =

Nymph in Greek mythology

Theisoa (Ancient Greek: Θεισόα) was one of the nymphs who brought up the infant Zeus and was worshipped at Theisoa in Arcadia. She is mentioned together with Neda and Hagno, who also helped raise Zeus. The city of Theisoa was named after her.
