= Anchiroe (mythology) =

In Greek mythology, Anchiroe (Ancient Greek: Αγχιροη, romanized: Ankhiroê, lit. 'pouring flow') may refer to the following figures:

- Anchiroe, also Anchirhoe (Ἀγχιρόη), an Arcadian nymph who together with other nymphs, Neda, Anthracia, Hagno and Myrtoessa, were nurses of the god Zeus. She was depicted to carry water-pots with what is meant to be water coming down from her.
- Anchiroe, one of the Erasinides, Argive naiad daughters of the river-god Erasinus. She and her sisters, Byze, Maera and Melite, received Britomartis.
- Anchiroe, daughter of the river god Chremetes, wife of Psyllus, the man who waged war against Notus, and mother by him of Crataigonos, a Libyan who joined Dionysus in his Indian campaign.
- Anchiroe or Achiroe, daughter of Nilus and wife of Belus.
- Anchiroe, consort of Sithon.
