= Myrtoessa =

Arcadian nymph

In Greek mythology, Myrtoessa (Ancient Greek: Μυρτώεσσα) was an Arcadian nymph. Along with other nymphs – Neda, Anthracia, Hagno and Anchirhoe – she was a nurse of the god Zeus. On a table in a sanctuary of Demeter and Persephone at Megalopolis, she and Anchirhoe were depicted as carrying water-pots. A non-marine mollusc called Myrtoessa hyas, in the Hydrobiidae (mud snail) family, is named after the nymph.
