= Melisseus =

Greek mythological character

In Greek mythology, Melisseus (Ancient Greek: Μελισσεύς, romanized: Melisseús, lit. 'bee-man' or 'honey-man'; pronounced /me.lis.seǔs/, meh-liss-EH-oos or meh-liss-YOOSS), was the father of the nymphs Adrasteia and Ida, who were nurses of the infant Zeus on Crete. His parentage differs from telling to telling, ranging from Gaia and Uranus, to Carystus the eponym of Karystos, and Socus and Combe.

== Mythology ==
Melisseus was the eldest and leader of the nine Kuretes of Crete. They were chthonic daimones of Mount Ida, who clashed their spears and shields to drown out the wails of infant Zeus, whom they received from the Great Goddess, Rhea, his mother. The infant-god was hidden from his cannibal father and was raised in the cave that was sacred to the Goddess (Da) celebrated by the Kuretes, whose name it bore and still bears. The names of the two daughters of Melisseus, one called the "inevitable" (Adrasteia) and the other simply "goddess" (Ida, de) are names used for the Great Mother Rhea herself.

The Dionysiaca of Nonnus, learned and accurate in spite of its late date, elaborates and gives all nine names of the Kuretes.

The infant god was fed on milk and honey, the milk from Amalthea, who is either a goat or nymph. Melisseus is simply another form of Melissus, also a Cretan "honey-man," remembered by later mythographers as a "king of Crete." Fermented honey, an entheogen that was the gift of the Goddess, preceded the knowledge of wine in Aegean culture. These honey-kings consorting with the Goddess will have combined their position of authority with a sacral role.

When he came to maturity, Zeus rewarded his nymph nurses with the horn of Amalthea, the cornucopia or horn of plenty that is always full of food and drink. Callimachus' Hymn to Zeus, full of witty and learned detail on the god's infancy, is at pains to show by etymologies that the mythic figures and geographical features obtained their names, and thus their very identities, through their participation in Zeus' early life. Other poets concur. A less Olympian-minded culture might have suggested that the horn was not actually Zeus' to give, and that it belonged already to the ancient and fertile Minoan-Mycenean nymphs of Crete.

In a mythic fragment that explains the connection of early Cretan culture with the island of Rhodes as deriving from Crete, Diodorus Siculus briefly relates that five of the Kuretes sailed from Crete to the Chersonnese (peninsula) opposite Rhodes, with a notable expedition, expelled the Carians who dwelt there, and settling down in the land divided it into five parts, each of them founding a city, which he named after himself. Triopas, one of the sons of Helios and Rhodos herself, who was a fugitive because of the murder of his brother Tenages, fled there and was purified of the murder by Melisseus.
