= Dyrrhachius =

Character in Greek mythology

In Greek mythology, Dyrrhachius (Ancient Greek: Δυρράχιος) son of Poseidon and Melissa, daughter of Epidamnus. He was the eponym of the town Dyrrhachium in Illyria.
