= Grant Showerman =

American classical philologist (1870–1935)

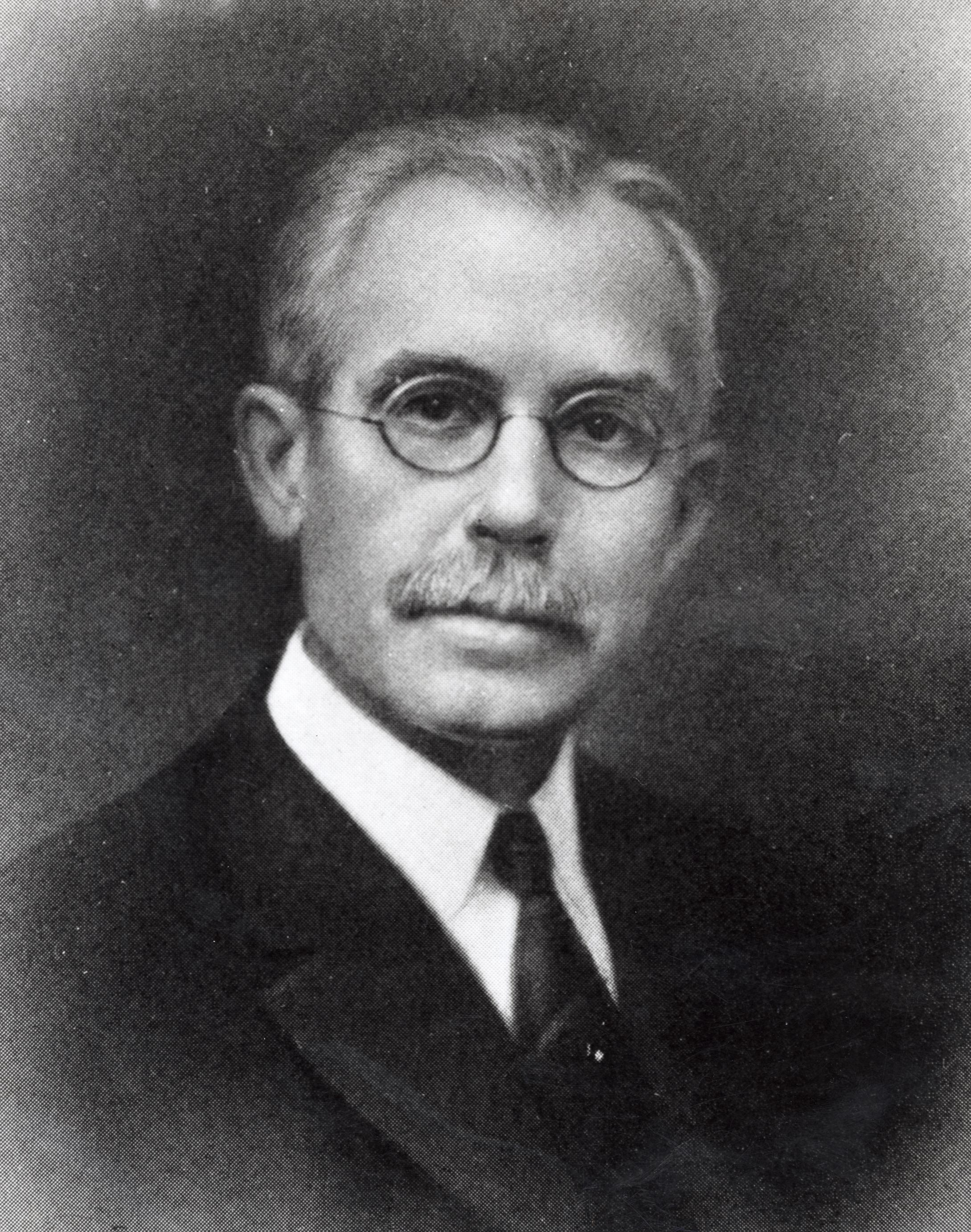
- Born: January 9, 1870; Brookfield, Waukesha County, Wisconsin, U.S.
- Died: November 13, 1935 (aged 65); Madison, Wisconsin, U.S.
- Education: University of Wisconsin
- Spouse: Zilpha Marie Vernon
- Parent(s): Hiram Showerman and Ellen Augusta Parker
- Relatives: Luther Parker (grandfather)

Grant Showerman Ph.D. (January 9, 1870 – November 13, 1935) was an American classical scholar.

== Career overview ==
Grant Showerman was born in Brookfield, Wisconsin in 1870. He was educated at Carroll College and at the University of Wisconsin–Madison, where he worked as instructor in Latin (1900–1909), and from 1909 until his death as professor of classics. Showerman House in Kronshage Hall is named after him.

== Works ==
- With the Professor, Henry Holt and Company, 1910.
- Horace and His Influence, The Plimpton Press, 1922.
- Eternal Rome, 2 Vol., Yale University Press, 1924.
- Rome and the Romans; A Survey and Interpretation, The Macmillan Company, 1931.
- Monuments and Men of Ancient Rome, D. Appleton-Century Company, 1935.

=== Translation ===
- OVID: Heroides and Amores, William Heinemann, The Macmillan Company, 1914.

=== Selected articles ===
- "Was Attis at Rome under the Republic?," Transactions and Proceedings of the American Philological Association, Vol. XXXI, 1900.
- "Cicero's Appreciation of Greek Art," Transactions and Proceedings of the American Philological Association, Vol. XXXIV, 1903.
- "The American College Course," Educational Review, September 1903.
- "Eastern Education Thru Western Eyes," Educational Review, Vol. XXX, December 1905.
- "A Professorial Meditation," Scribner's Magazine, Vol. XL, July/December 1906.
- "Mud and Nails," Educational Review, Vol. XXXV, May 1908.
- "College Professors Exposed," Educational Review, Vol. XXXVI, June/December 1908.
- "The Ancient Religions in Universal History," American Journal of Philology, Vol. XXIX, No. 114, 1908.
- "A Professorial Recantation," Educational Review, Vol. XXXVIII, June 1909.
- "The Making of a Professor," Atlantic Monthly, Vol. CIV, November 1909.
- "The Literary History of Rome," The Dial, Vol. XLVII, July/December 1909.
- "Philosophy of Trimmings," Atlantic Monthly, Vol. CV, 1910.
- "Peace and the Professor," Part II, The Kindergarten-Primary Magazine, Vol. XXIII, September 1910/June 1911.
- "Introduction to Study of Greek Mythology." In The World's Progress, Part II, The Delphian Society, 1911.
- "The Foxfielders at School," Educational Review, Vol. XLI, January 1911.
- "The Ancients Illuminated," The Dial, Vol. L, January/June 1911.
- "Let's us Have Peace!," The Dial, Vol. L, January/June 1911.
- "The Ferreresque Style of Writing History," The Dial, Vol. LI, July/December 1911.
- "The Making of a Democrat," The Yale Review, Vol. I, 1911/1912.
- "The Glory that was Greece," The Dial, Vol. LII, January/June 1912.
- "Roman Religious Experience," The Dial, Vol. LII, January/June 1912.
- "Life and Letters," Educational Review, Vol. XLV, February 1913.
- "Sunday in Andalusia," The Atlantic Monthly, Vol. CXIII, 1914.
- "The Democrat Reflects," The Unpopular Review, Vol. I, January/June 1914.
- "The Story of a Microbophobiac," The Unpopular Review, Vol. I, January/June 1914.
- "The Case for Pigeon-Holes," The Unpopular Review, Vol. I, January/June 1914.
- "A Critic of Democracy," The Dial, Vol. LVII, July/December 1914.

- "Balzac and Flaubert," The Dial, Vol. LVII, July/December 1914.
- "The Republic of Megaphon," The Unpopular Review, Vol. II, No. 4, October/December 1914.
- "Fitness First," The Methodist Review, Vol. XXXI, January/February 1915.
- "The Liberal Arts and Scientific Management," The Popular Science Monthly, June 1915.
- "Valencia, and May," The Catholic World, Vol. CI, April/September 1915.
- "The Drama Movement," The Dial, Vol. LVIII, January/June 1915.
- "The Great Vocation," The Dial, Vol. LIX, June/December 1915.
- "The New Painting," The Dial, Vol. LIX, June/December 1915.
- "The Way of the Translator," The Unpopular Review, Vol. V, No. 9, January/March 1916.
- "The Acceptable Year of the Lord," The Dial, Vol. LX, January/June 1916.
- "Painting and the Public," The Dial, Vol. LX, January/June 1916.
- "Sixty Years of the American Stage," The Dial, Vol. LXI, June/December 1916.
- "Modest Modernist Papers," Part II, The Unpopular Review, Vol. VII, January/June 1917.
- "Smith, Smoke and the War," The New Republic, February 1918.
- “Machine and Man,” The Unpopular Review, Vol. IX, No. 18, April/June 1918.
- "Theophrastus up to Date," The Bookman, Vol. XLVII, March/August 1918.
- "The Ethernal City." In Classical Studies in Honor of Charles Foster Smith, Madison, 1919.
- "Measuring the Immeasurable," The Nation, No. 109, July 1919.
- "The Professor and the Pipes," The Unpopular Review, Vol. XI, No. 22, April/June 1919.
- "The Pope's Last Appearance," University of California Chronicle, Vol. XXIV, 1922.
- "The Dead and the Quick in Eternal Home," The Independent, Vol. CVIII, January/June 1922.
- "Music Before a Roman Jury," The Independent, Vol. CIX, July/December 1922.
- "The Struggle for Liberty," University of California Chronicle, 1926.
- "Heckling the College," School and Society, Vol. XXIV, July/December 1926.
- "The Liberal College," School and Society, Vol. XXV, January/June 1927.
- "Art and Decency," The Yale Review, Vol. XI, 1922.
- "A Most Lamentable Comedy," School and Society, Vol. XXXIII, April 1931.

=== Other publications ===
- "Attis." In: Encyclopædia of Religion and Ethics, Vol. II, Charles Scribner's Sons, 1909.
- "Criobolium." In: Encyclopædia of Religion and Ethics, Vol. IV, Charles Scribner's Sons, 1909.
- "Cybele." In: Encyclopædia of Religion and Ethics, Vol. IV, Charles Scribner's Sons, 19089.
- "Death and Disposal of the Dead." In: Encyclopædia of Religion and Ethics, Vol. IV, Charles Scribner's Sons, 19098.
- Franz Cumont, The Oriental Religions in Roman Paganism, with an introductory essay by Grant Showerman, Open Court Pub. Co., 1911.
- "Isis." In: Encyclopædia of Religion and Ethics, Vol. VII, 1914.
- "Martial's Epigrams." In: Encyclopædia Americana, Vol. XVIII, 1919.
- "Taurobolium.” In: Encyclopædia of Religion and Ethics, Vol. XII, 1921.
- Author:Grant Showerman – via Wikisource.
