= Anthracia (mythology) =

Arcadian nymph in Greek mythology

In Greek mythology, Anthracia (Ancient Greek: Ἀνθρακία) was an Arcadian nymph. According to Pausanias, she was depicted holding a torch on a table at a temple in Megalopolis, alongside the nymphs Neda, Hagno, Anchiroe and Myrtoessa, and the young Zeus, with her presumably being shown as one of the nurses of the infant god. Pausanias also mentions her as one of the figures on one side of an altar of Athena at Tegea, in the centre of which the young Zeus is held by his mother Rhea and the nymph Oenoe.

== Bibliography ==
- Pausanias, Pausanias Description of Greece with an English Translation by W.H.S. Jones, Litt.D., and H.A. Ormerod, M.A., in 4 Volumes, Cambridge, Massachusetts, Harvard University Press; London, William Heinemann Ltd., 1918. Online version at the Perseus Digital Library.
- Wissowa, Georg, Realencyclopädie der classischen Altertumswissenschaft, Band 1, Halbband 2, Stuttgart, J. B. Metzler, 1894. Online version at Wikisource.
