= Theisoa (Arcadia) =

Coordinates: 37°31′00″N 21°56′03″E

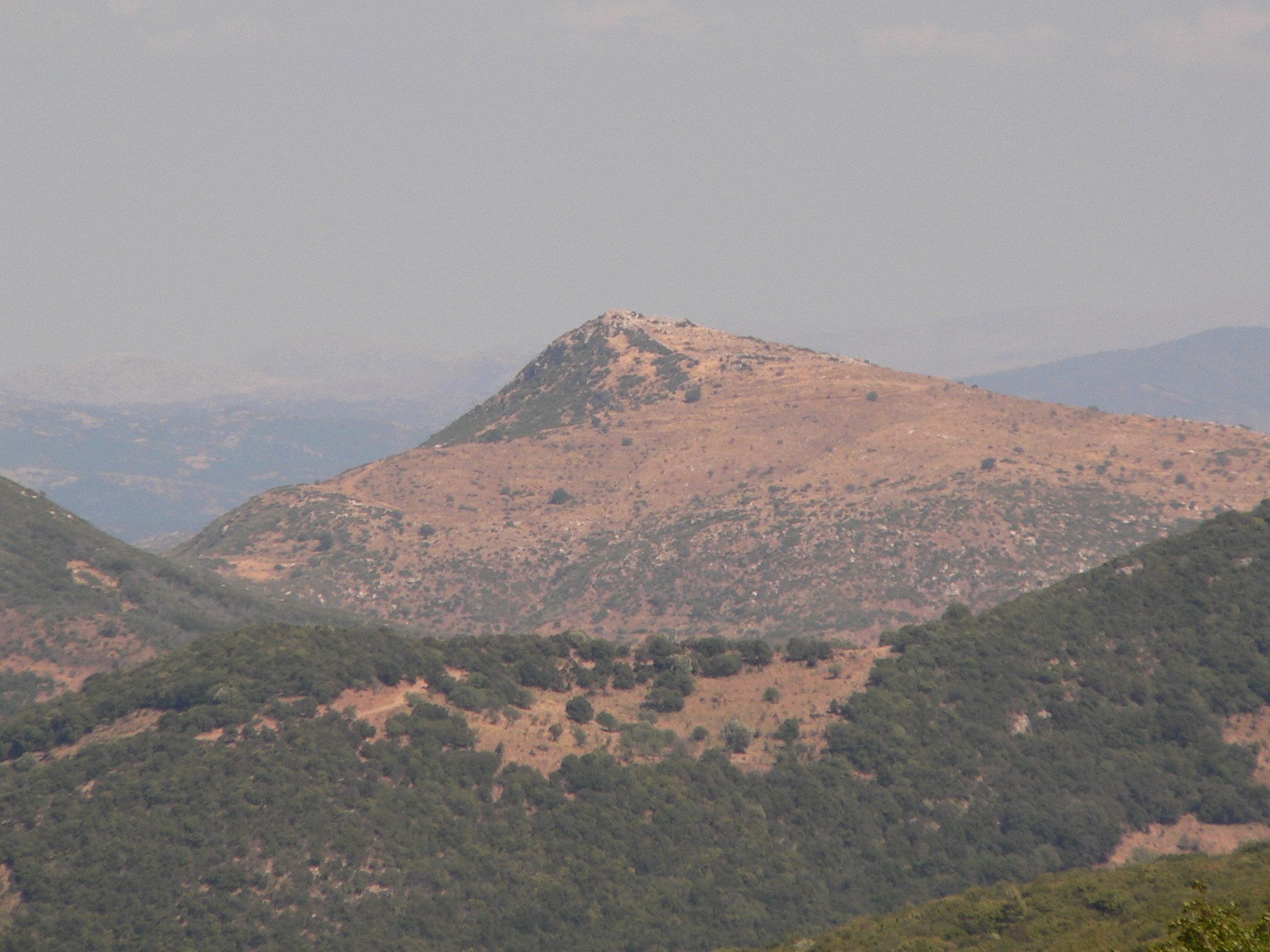
View of Theisoa from Alipheira to the north.

Theisoa (Ancient Greek: Θεισόα) was an ancient town in the region of Arcadia. It was located in the district Cynuria or Parrhasia, on the northern slope of Mount Lycaeus.

Theisoa is also the name of a nymph (Theisoa), one of the nurses of Zeus. Whether the nymph or the place bore the name first cannot be determined. The city was built in the middle 4th century BC. However, there seems to have been a settlement or landscape of this name before, as Theisoa is mentioned as a member of the Synoecism of Megalopolis (371 BCE). The city seems to have lost its importance during the Hellenistic period, but coin finds from the 4th century AD indicate that the settlement continued to exist after that. The city walls were reused in the middle ages, when the site probably bore the name of Château Sainte Hélène, mentioned in the Chronicle of Morea.

Its site is located near the modern Theisoa. The ancient city wall was 895 meters long; the highest part was cut off by a second wall. The agora may have laid in the west of the fortified area.

== Bibliography ==
- Mattern, Torsten; Goester, Yvonne C. (2023). Thisoa am Lykaion. Ergebnisse der Forschungen [Thisoa on the Lykaion. Results of the investigation]. Wiesbaden: Reichert, ISBN 978-3-95490-538-6.
