= Gerard Mussies =

Former Theology lecturer

- Born: 1934 (age 91–92); The Hague, Netherlands

Academic background
- Education: Leiden University
- Thesis: The Morphology of Koine Greek As Used in the Apocalypse of St. John: A Study in Bilingualism (1971)

Academic work
- Discipline: theology
- Institutions: University of Utrecht
- Main interests: New Testament Hellenism

Gerard Mussies (born 1934 in the Hague) is a retired senior lecturer in the New Testament Hellenistic background at the Faculty of Theology at the University of Utrecht, The Netherlands. He taught biblical Greek and studied the Greek-Roman background of the New Testament.

== Education ==
Mussies became a doctor with the presentation of his thesis in 1971 titled The Morphology of Koine Greek As Used in the Apocalypse of St. John: A Study in Bilingualism.

== Books ==
- G. Mussies (1971-12-01). The Morphology of Koine Greek As Used in the Apocalypse of St. John: A Study in Bilingualism. Novum Testamentum/Supplements. Vol. 27. Leiden: Brill. doi:10.1163/9789004266049. ISBN 978-90-04-26604-9. OCLC 258344.
- Gerard Mussies (1972-06-01). Dio Chrysostom and the New Testament: Collected Parallels. Studia ad corpus Hellenisticum Novi Testamenti. Vol. 2. BRILL. ISBN 9789004034051. OCLC 624426.
- A F J Klijn; Gerard Mussies (1983). Der lateinische Text der Apokalypse des Esra. Texte und Untersuchungen zur Geschichte der altchristlichen Literatur (in Latin). Vol. 131. Berlin: Akademie-Verlag. OCLC 907590373.
- Pieter Willem van der Horst; Gerard Mussies (1990). Studies on the Hellenistic background of the New Testament. Utrechtse theologische reeks. Vol. 10. Utrecht: Faculteit der Godgeleerdheid van de Rijksuniversiteit. OCLC 22950588.
- Gerard Mussies (1991). De autobiografie van de joodse historicus Flavius Josephus. Na de schriften. Vol. 8. Kampen: Kok, cop. ISBN 9789024265312. OCLC 65636810.
- Abraham, ben David ha-Levi; Gerard Mussies (2001). De joodse kroniek van Abraham ibn-Daud: een historisch werk uit de Middeleeuwen. Joodse bronnen. Vol. 3. Baarn: Ten Have, cop. ISBN 9789025952211. OCLC 67303986.
