= Korybantes =

Ancient Greek deities

According to Greek mythology, the Korybantes (/ˌkɒrɪˈbæntiːz/; Ancient Greek: Κορύβαντες), also spelled Corybantes or Corybants, were the armed and crested dancers who worshipped the Phrygian goddess Cybele with drumming and dancing. They are also called the Kurbantes in Phrygia.

== Etymology ==
The name Korybantes is of uncertain etymology. Edzard Johan Furnée and R. S. P. Beekes have suggested a Pre-Greek origin.

Others refer the name to *κορυβή (korybé), the Macedonian version of κορυφή (koryphé) "crown, top, mountain peak", explaining their association with mountains, particularly Olympus.

== Family ==
The Korybantes were the offspring of Apollo by either the Muse Thalia, or the nymph Rhetia, or the nymph Danais. One account attests the parentage to Zeus and the Muse Calliope, or to Helios and Athena, or lastly, to Cronus.

== Kouretes ==
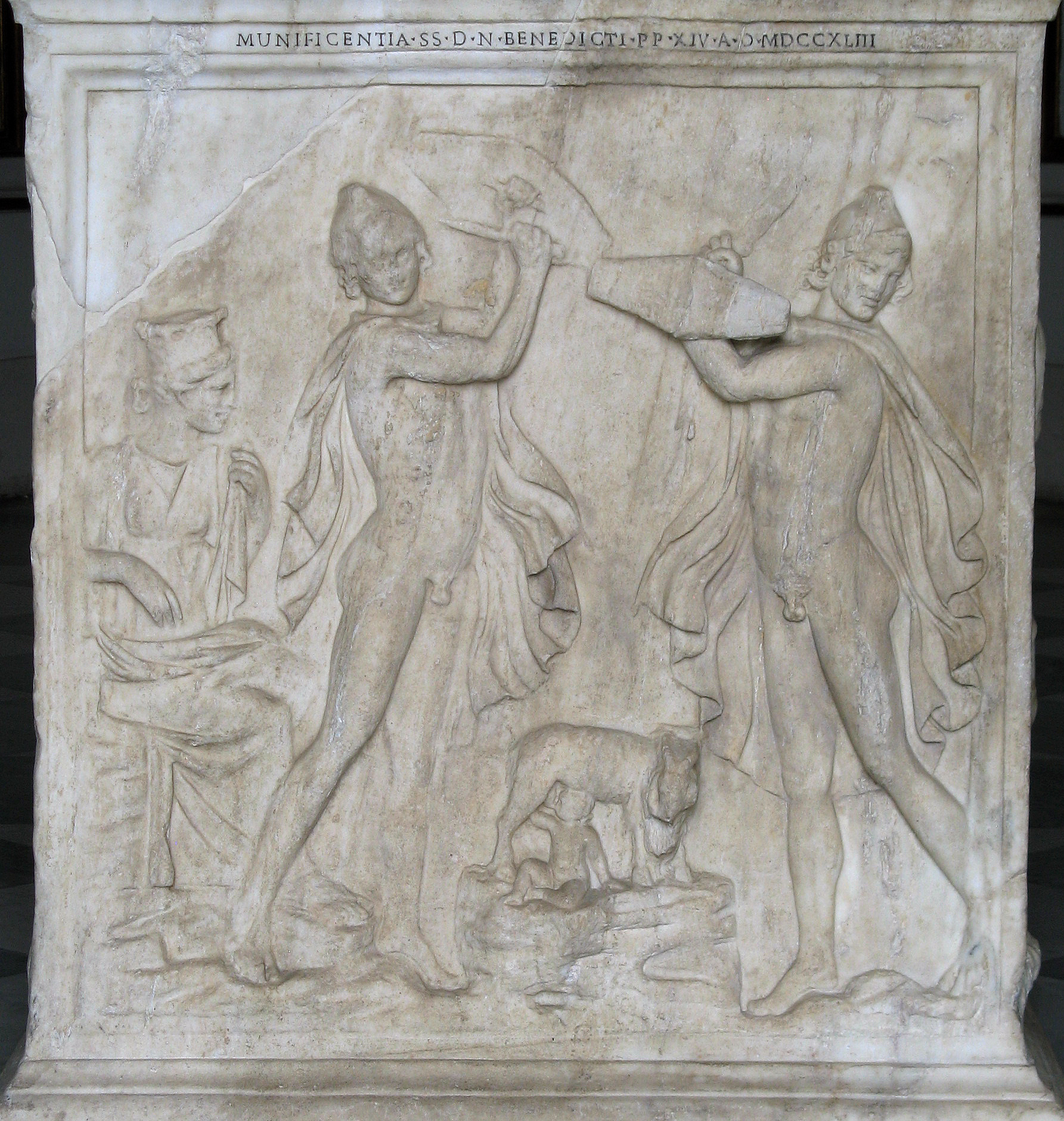
Two Kouretes dance raucously, behind whom the goat Amalthea suckles the infant Zeus. Marble relief from the 2nd century AD, Capitoline Museum. (Note: LIMC, p. 583; Digital LIMC 1942 (Amaltheia 6).)

The Kouretes (Κουρῆτες), also spelled Kuretes were nine dancers who venerated Rhea, the Cretan counterpart of Cybele. A fragment from Strabo's Book VII gives a sense of the roughly analogous character of these male confraternities, and the confusion rampant among those not initiated:

Many assert that the gods worshipped in Samothrace as well as the Kurbantes and the Korybantes and in like manner the Kouretes and the Idaean Daktyls are the same as the Kabeiroi, but as to the Kabeiroi they are unable to tell who they are.

Grant Showerman in the Encyclopædia Britannica Eleventh Edition addressed the confusion, stating that the Korybantes "are distinguished [from the Kuretes] only by their Asiatic origin and by the more pronouncedly orgiastic nature of their rites".

According to Oppian, the Curetes, who had been tasked with guarding the young Zeus, were turned into lions by Cronus. Zeus then made them into the kings of the animals, while his mother Rhea yoked them to her chariot.

== Initiatory dance ==
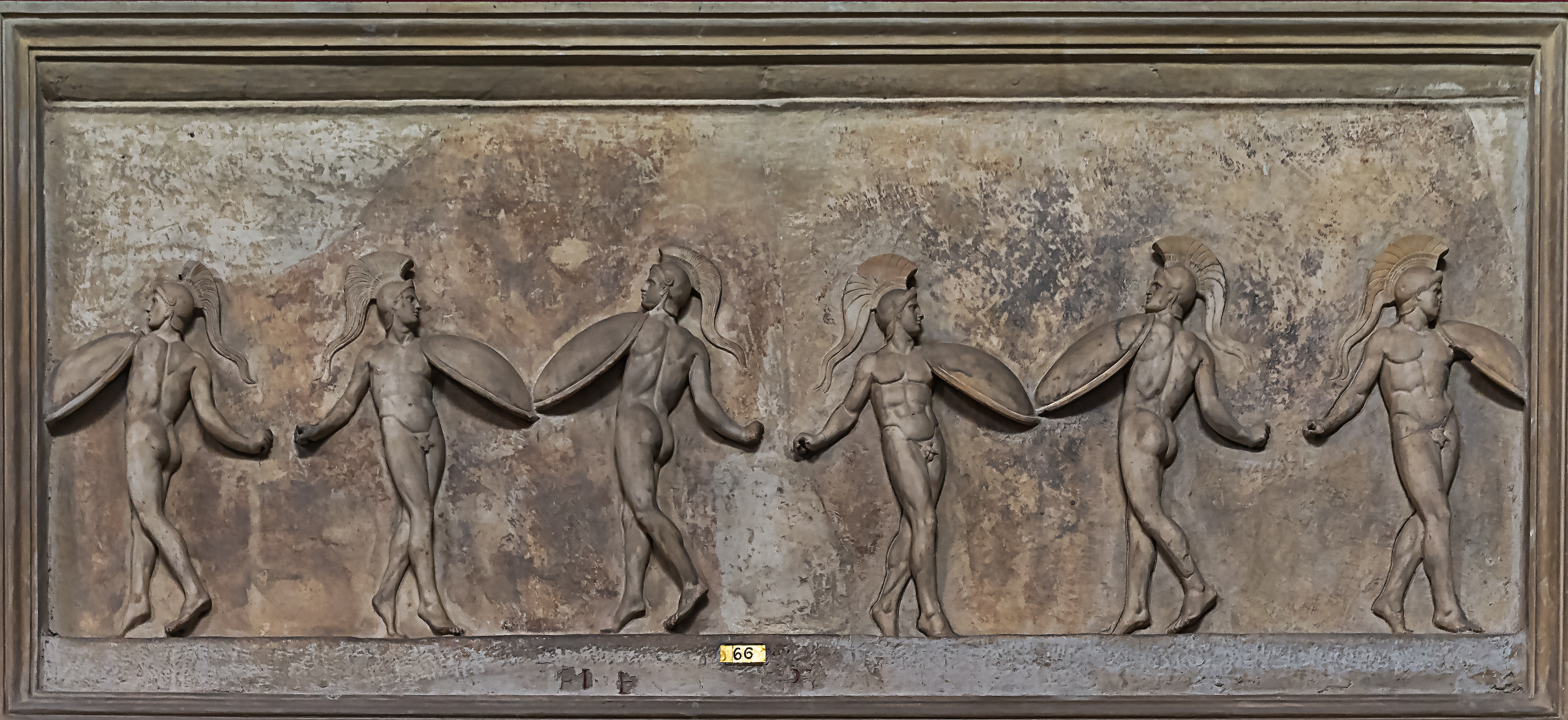
Roman relief of a pyrrhiche or Corybantian dance (Vatican Museums 321)

These armored male dancers kept time to a drum and the rhythmic stamping of their feet. Dance, according to Greek thought, was one of the civilizing activities, like wine-making or music. The dance in armor (the "Pyrrhic dance" or pyrrhichios [Πυρρίχη]) was a male coming-of-age initiation ritual linked to a warrior victory celebration. Both Jane Ellen Harrison and the French classicist Henri Jeanmaire have shown that both the Kouretes (Κουρῆτες) and Cretan Zeus, who was called "the greatest kouros (κοῦρος)", were intimately connected with the transition of boys into manhood in Cretan cities.

The English "Pyrrhic Dance" is a corruption of the original Pyrríkhē or the Pyrríkhios Khorós "Pyrrhichian Dance". It has no relationship with the king Pyrrhus of Epirus, who invaded Italy in the 3rd century BC, and who gave his name to the Pyrrhic victory, which was achieved at such cost that it was tantamount to a defeat.

== Ecstatics ==
The Phrygian Korybantes were often confused by Greeks with other ecstatic male confraternities, such as the Idaean Dactyls or the Cretan Kouretes, spirit-youths (kouroi) who acted as guardians of the infant Zeus. In Hesiod's telling of Zeus's birth, when Great Gaia came to Crete and hid the child Zeus in a "steep cave", beneath the secret places of the earth, on Mount Aigaion with its thick forests; there the Cretan Kouretes' ritual clashing spears and shields were interpreted by Hellenes as intended to drown out the infant god's cries, and prevent his discovery by his cannibal father Cronus. Emily Vermeule observed,

This myth is Greek interpretation of mystifying Minoan ritual in an attempt to reconcile their Father Zeus with the Divine Child of Crete; the ritual itself we may never recover with clarity, but it is not impossible that a connection exists between the Kouretes' weapons at the cave and the dedicated weapons at Arkalochori".

Among the offerings recovered from the cave, the most spectacular are decorated bronze shields with patterns that draw upon north Syrian originals and a bronze gong on which a god and his attendants are shown in a distinctly Near Eastern style.

Korybantes also presided over the infancy of Dionysus, another god who was born as a babe, and of Zagreus, a Cretan child of Zeus, or child-doublet of Zeus. The wild ecstasy of their cult can be compared to the female Maenads who followed Dionysus.

Ovid, in Metamorphoses, says the Kouretes were born from rainwater (Uranus fertilizing Gaia). This suggests a connection with the Hyades.

== Other functions ==
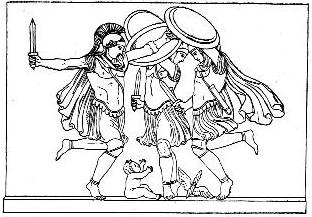
The Kouretes dancing around the infant Zeus, as pictured in Themis by Jane Ellen Harrison (1912, p. 23; see References section below).

The scholar Jane Ellen Harrison writes that besides being guardians, nurturers, and initiators of the infant Zeus, the Kouretes were primitive magicians and seers. She also writes that they were metal workers and that metallurgy was considered an almost magical art. There were several "tribes" of Korybantes, including the Cabeiri, the Korybantes Euboioi, the Korybantes Samothrakioi. Hoplodamos and his Gigantes were counted among Korybantes, and the Titan Anytos was considered a Kourete.

Homer referred to select young men as kouretes, when Agamemnon instructs Odysseus to pick out kouretes, the bravest among the Achaeans to bear gifts to Achilles. The Greeks preserved a tradition down to Strabo's day, that the Kuretes of Aetolia and Acarnania in mainland Greece had been imported from Crete.

In The Greeks and the Irrational, Dodds treats the Corybantic rites as a ritual form of psychological healing that professed to cure what Plato describes as "phobies or anxiety-feelings." The treatment involved "orgiastic" dance and extremely stimulating music in the Phrygian mode, being played on the flute and kettledrum. Dodds sees this ritual as closely related to the older Dionysiac cure: a person is in a state of inner agitation, then outer agitation is deliberately induced through music and dance. This produces catharsis and ultimately relief.
