= Neda (mythology) =

Nurse of Zeus in Greek mythology

In Greek mythology, Neda (Ancient Greek: Νέδα, romanized: Néda) is a Messenian or Arcadian nymph and one of the nurses of the child Zeus.

The river Neda and a town in Arcadia were both named after her.

== Etymology ==
Neda is an old Greek word meaning 'water, river' and it is of the same origin as the Sanskrit Nadī.

== Mythology ==
In the Messenian account, Neda, together with another nymph Ithome, brought up and bathed the infant Zeus after he was stolen by the Curetes owing to the danger that threatened from his father. These nymphs gave their name to the river Neda and mountain Ithome. In one account, after Rhea gave birth to Zeus in Arcadia she begged Gaia for some water to bathe the infant, and so the river Neda gushed forth in accordance to her wish.

Meanwhile, the Arcadian version claimed that Neda, Anthracia, Hagno, Anchirhoe and Myrtoessa were the nurturers of the future king of the gods. Neda was depicted to carry the infant god.

== Worship ==
She was represented at Athens in the temple of Athena.
