= Hagno (mythology) =

Arcadian nymph and nurse of the god Zeus in Greek mythology

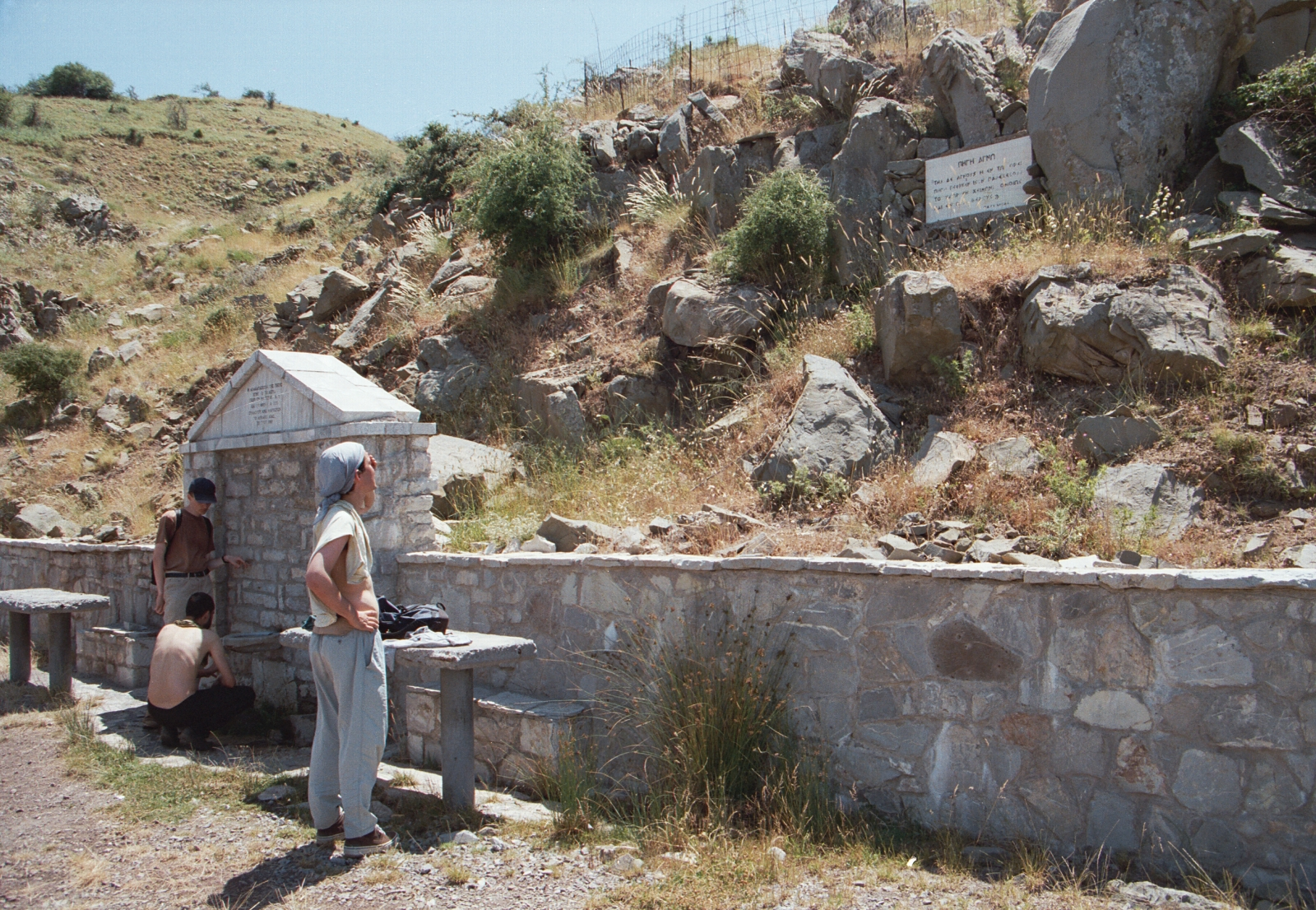

In Greek mythology, Hagno (Ancient Greek: Ἁγνὼ means 'pure, chaste, holy') was the Arcadian nymph who together with other nymphs, Neda, Anthracia, Anchirhoe and Myrtoessa, were nurses of the god Zeus. She was depicted to have a water-pot in one hand and a bowl in the other.
