= Phoronis (epic poem) =

Ancient Greek epic poem

The Phoronis is a lost ancient Greek epic poem. It told the story of the local Tirynthian culture hero Phoroneus. The author is unknown. Various internal evidence suggest a date between the late seventh and sixth-century BC, although a fifth-century BC date is possible.
