= Lexicon Iconographicum Mythologiae Classicae =

Encyclopedia of mythology

The Lexicon Iconographicum Mythologiae Classicae (abbreviated LIMC) is a multivolume encyclopedia cataloguing representations of mythology in the plastic arts of classical antiquity. Published serially from 1981 to 2009, it is the most extensive resource of its kind, providing "full and detailed information." Entries are arranged alphabetically, with black-and-white illustrations indexed to their respective entries. There is also an online database pertaining to the LIMC maintained at weblimc.org, called the Digital LIMC.

The LIMC was prepared by international scholars from nearly 40 countries who contributed in their language of choice, resulting in entries written variously in English, German, French, or Italian. The LIMC also offers a multilingual online database that is updated independently of the print publication.

In 1987, Brunilde Ridgway wrote that though the initial volume was met with "understandable caution", due to the enormity of the task being embarked upon, after the publication of its second volume, "no reservations should remain". In the 21st century, the LIMC has been called an "indispensable research instrument," "monumental," and "magnificent."

In the United States, the LIMC is based at the Alexander Library of Rutgers University.

== Volumes ==
- Lexicon Iconographicum Mythologiae Classicae (LIMC), Artemis & Winkler Verlag (Zürich, München, Düsseldorf), 1981–1999 ISBN 3-7608-8751-1

Vol. I: Aara – Aphlad (1981)
Vol. II: Aphrodisias – Athena (1984)
Vol. III: Atherion – Eros / Amor, Cupido (1986)
Vol. IV: Eros (in Etruria) – Herakles (1988)
Vol. V: Herakles – Kenchrias (1990)
Vol. VI: Kentauroi et Kentaurides – Oiax (1992)
Vol. VII: Oidipous – Theseus (1994)
Vol. VIII: Thespiades – Zodiacus et Supplementum (1997)
Indices

1. Museums, Collections, Sites (1999)
2. Literary and Epigraphical Sources mentioning lost Works. Mythological Names (1999)

- Lexicon Iconographicum Mythologiae Classicae. Supplementum 2009 (LIMC), Artemis Verlag (Düsseldorf), 2009. ISBN 978-3-538-03520-1
