= 25 Orionis =

Star in the constellation Orion

25 Orionis, ψ^{1} Orionis
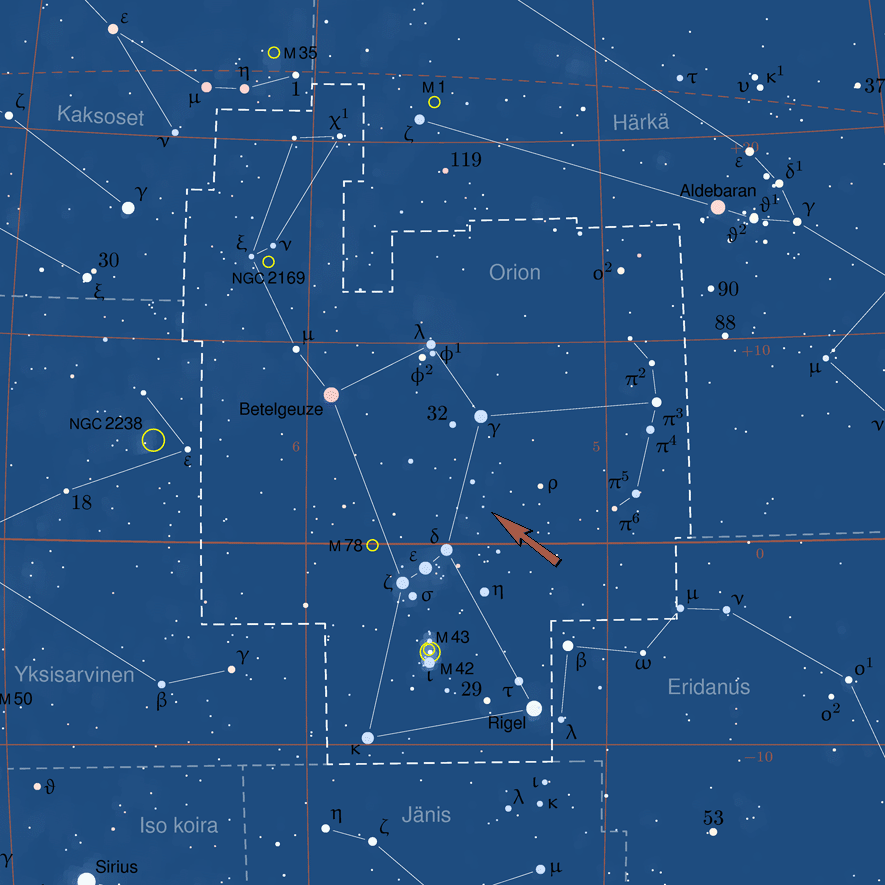
- 25 Orionis is located roughly between δ Ori and γ Ori.

Observation data Epoch J2000 Equinox ICRS
- Constellation: Orion
- Right ascension: 05^{h} 24^{m} 44.82738^{s}
- Declination: +01° 50′ 47.2019″
- Apparent magnitude (V): 4.92 - 4.96

Characteristics
- Spectral type: B1Vn
- U−B color index: −0.92
- B−V color index: −0.20
- Variable type: γ Cas

Astrometry
Radial velocity (R_{v})	19.3 ± 2 km/s
Proper motion (μ)	RA: +1.047 mas/yr Dec.: +0.433 mas/yr
Parallax (π)	2.9321±0.1219 mas
Distance	1,110 ± 50 ly (340 ± 10 pc)

Details
Mass	10.5 M_{☉}
Radius	6.4 R_{☉}
Luminosity	10,500 L_{☉}
Surface gravity (log g)	4.0 cgs
Temperature	24,661 ± 339 K
Rotational velocity (v sin i)	316 km/s
Age	~ 7 -- 10 Myr

Other designations
- ψ^{1} Ori, 25 Ori, V1086 Ori, BD+01 1005, FK5 2406, HD 35439, HIP 25302, HR 1789, SAO 112734, CCDM J05247+0150A

Database references
SIMBAD	data

25 Orionis, less commonly known by its Bayer designation Psi^{1} Orionis (ψ^{1} Orionis, ψ^{1} Ori) is a fifth-magnitude star in the constellation Orion. It lies among a dense cluster of low-mass pre-main-sequence stars in the Orion OB1a.

== Stellar group ==
25 Orionis is the dominant member of a rich low-mass star region, first identified in 2005 in a statistical analysis of 2.5 million stars. It is one of several sub-associations within Orion OB1a, all thought to lie at around the same distance of 338 parsecs. Over 200 members of the 25 Orionis stellar group have been found, mostly T Tauri stars with spectral types of K and M and masses less than half the sun's. There are also around 60 hotter stars in the region, including the eruptive variable V346 Tauri. This region is known as Briceño 1.

== Properties ==
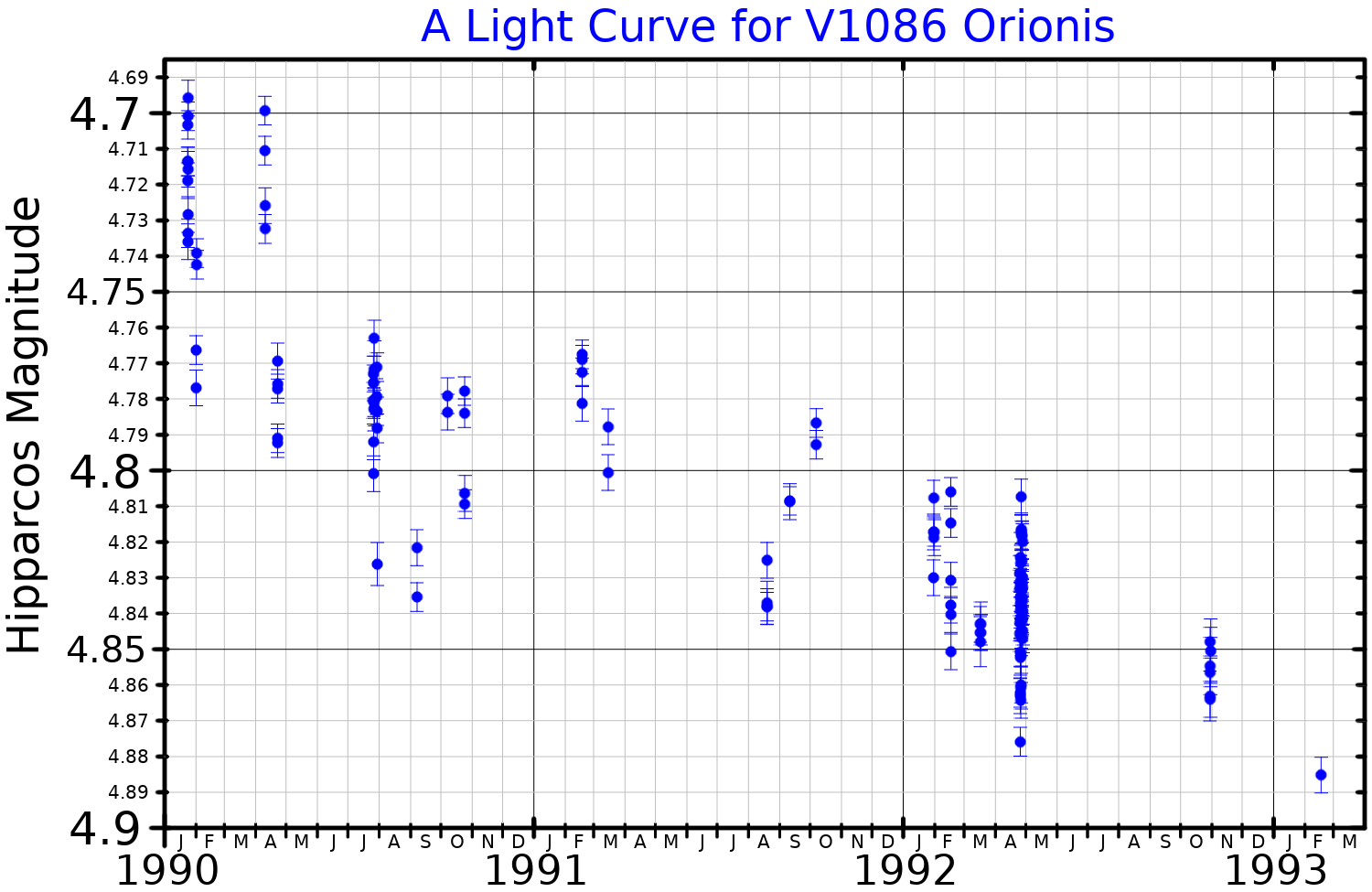
A light curve for V1086 Orionis, plotted from Hipparcos data

Like the star Pleione in the Pleiades open cluster, 25 Ori is a Be star with a gaseous circumstellar disk. The SIMBAD astronomical database lists its spectral class as B1Vn.

25 Orionis is a fast rotator, clocking a rotational velocity of 316 km/s, significantly faster than Achernar's speed of 251 km/s in the constellation Eridanus. Having a radius of 6 R_{☉}, the star rotates on its axis roughly once every 23 hours. With a mass in excess of 10 M_{☉}, the star is expected to explode as a supernova.

25 Orionis is a Gamma Cassiopeiae variable star, and has been given the variable star designation V1086 Orionis. The General Catalog of Variable Stars lists its magnitude as varying between magnitude 4.92 and 4.96 in the visual (V) band - an amplitude only 0.04 magnitudes. However photometry by the Hipparcos satellite, which had a passband broader than the V band, showed a 0.145 magnitude range in brightness.

== See also ==
- Class B Stars
- Shell star
