= Alcyone (star) =

Star system in the constellation Taurus

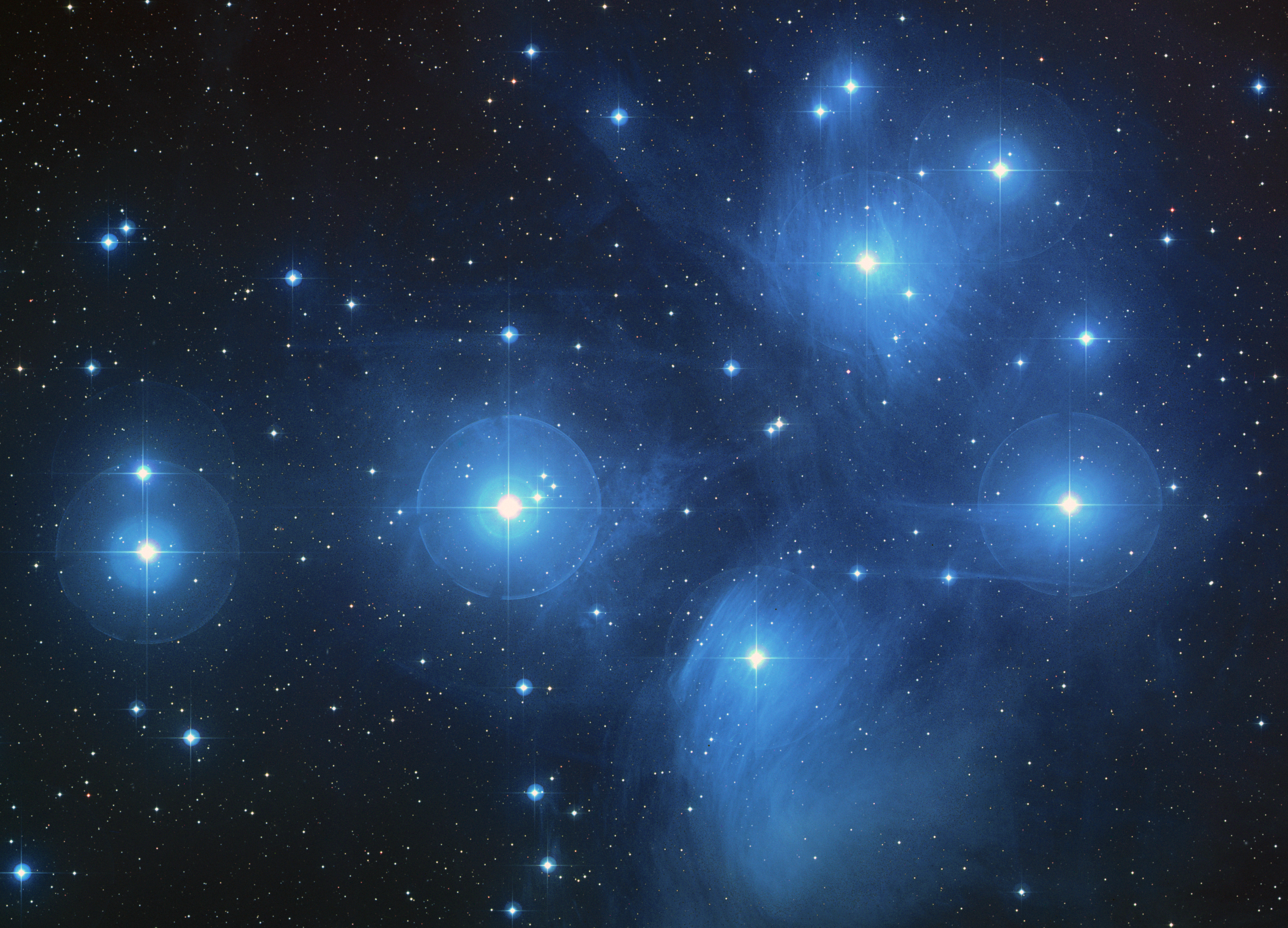
- Alcyone in the Pleiades cluster (circled)

Observation data Epoch J2000 Equinox ICRS
- Constellation: Taurus
- Right ascension: 03^{h} 47^{m} 29.077^{s}
- Declination: +24° 06′ 18.49″
- Apparent magnitude (V): 2.87

Characteristics
- Evolutionary stage: subgiant
- Spectral type: B7IIIe
- U−B color index: −0.34
- B−V color index: −0.09

Astrometry
Radial velocity (R_{v})	5.40 km/s
Proper motion (μ)	RA: 19.34±0.39 mas/yr Dec.: −43.67±0.33 mas/yr
Parallax (π)	8.09±0.42 mas
Distance	136 pc
Absolute magnitude (M_{V})	−2.62

Details
Mass	5.9 – 6.1 M_{☉}
Radius	10.56 (equatorial); 8.0 (polar) R_{☉}
Luminosity	1,750±50 L_{☉}
Surface gravity (log g)	3.047 cgs
Temperature	12,258 K
Rotational velocity (v sin i)	149 km/s
Age	70 Myr

Other designations
- η Tau, 25 Tau, HR 1165, HD 23630, BD+23 541, FK5 139, HIP 17702, SAO 76199, GC 4541, BDS 1875, CCDM 03474+2407

Database references
SIMBAD	data

Alcyone /ælˈsaɪəniː/, is a blue-white giant star and the brightest star in the Pleiades open cluster. At apparent magnitude 2.87, it is also the third-brightest star in the constellation Taurus. The star has the Bayer designation Eta Tauri, Latinized from η Tauri and abbreviated Eta Tau or η Tau. It is about 440 light-years distant.

== Nomenclature ==
Eta Tauri is the star's Bayer designation. The name Alcyone originates in Greek mythology; she is one of the seven daughters of Atlas and Pleione known as the Pleiades. In 2016, the International Astronomical Union (IAU) organized a Working Group on Star Names (WGSN) to catalog and standardize proper names for stars. The WGSN's first bulletin of July 2016 included a table of the first two batches of names approved by the WGSN; which included Alcyone for this star. It is now so entered in the IAU Catalog of Star Names.

In Chinese, 昴宿 (Mǎo Xiù), meaning Hairy Head, refers to an asterism consisting Alcyone, Electra, Taygeta, Asterope, Maia, Merope, and Atlas. Consequently, the Chinese name for Alcyone itself is 昴宿六 (Mǎo Xiù liù), "the Sixth Star of Hairy Head".

== Physical properties ==
Alcyone is a blue-white B-type giant, similar to the other bright B-type stars in the Pleiades cluster. With an apparent magnitude of +2.87 and absolute magnitude of −2.39, it is the brightest and most luminous star in the Pleiades. The spectral type of B7IIIe indicates that emission lines are present in its spectrum. Like many Be stars, Alcyone has created a gaseous disk flung into orbit around the star from its equator.

Alcyone has a high rotational velocity, which causes it to have an ellipsoidal shape. Its effective radius is almost ten times that of the Sun, but the actual radius is lesser at poles and greater at the equator. Its effective temperature is 12,258 K, with the actual temperature being greater at the poles and lesser at the equator. Its bolometric luminosity is 1,750 times solar. The rapid rotation causes Alcyone to be an oblate shape, with the equatorial radius being 10.56 R_{☉} and the polar radius to be 8.0 R_{☉}.

The age of the Pleiades is typically calculated to be around 130 million years, but Alcyone itself appears to be younger, less than 100 million years. Alcyone may be a blue straggler or models may not be deriving an accurate age for stars of this type.

== Variability ==
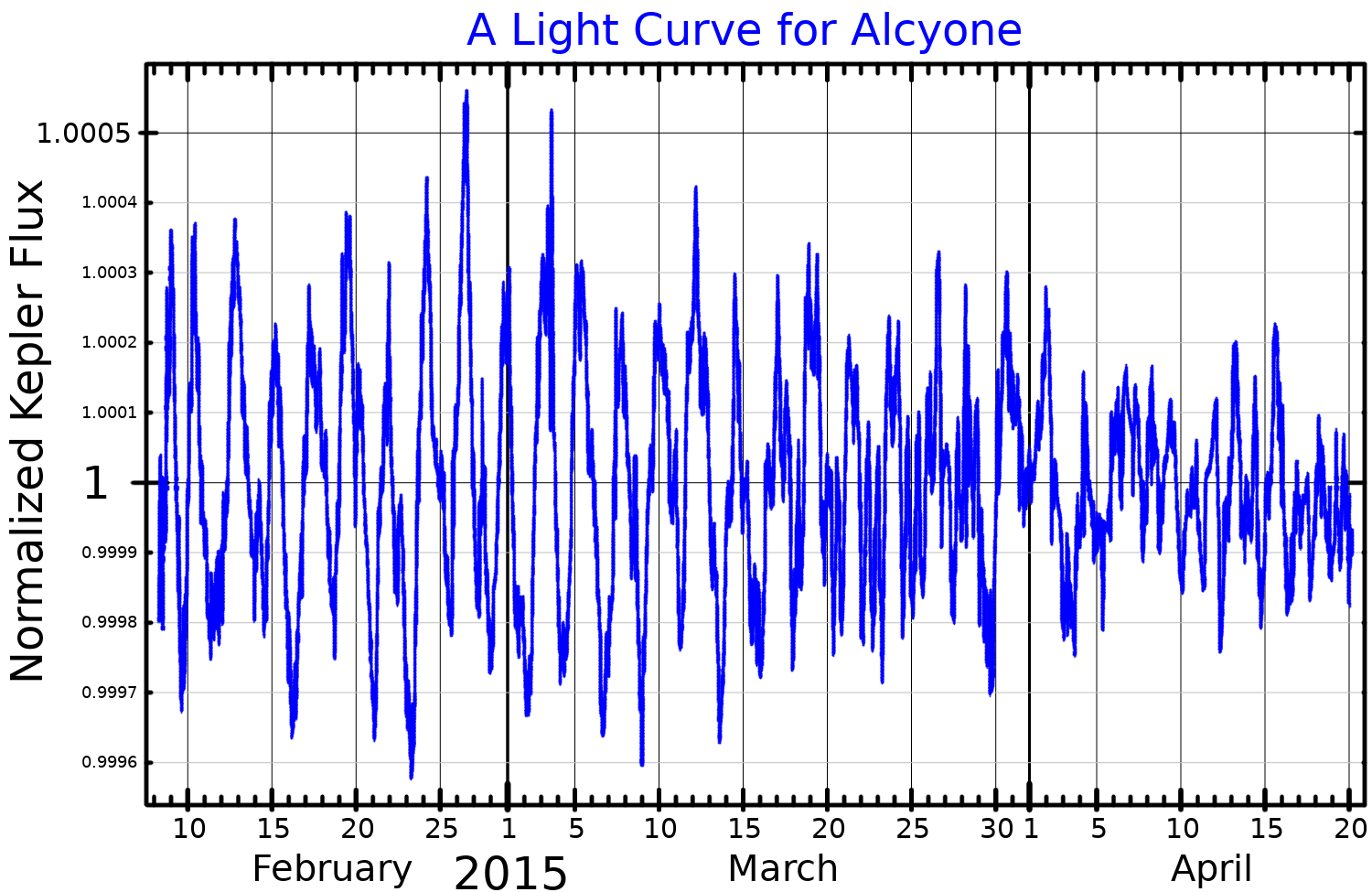
A light curve for Alcyone, adapted from White et al. (2017)

Alcyone has long been suspected to vary in brightness, and a 2017 study using data from the Kepler Space Telescope found definite periodic variations with amplitudes up to 0.001 magnitudes. This is considered undetectable by ground-based observations. The strongest period of 2.3 days is thought to be the rotation period of the star, with an uneven surface causing slight brightness changes, but there are also more rapid pulsations and Alcyone has been classified as both a rotational variable and a slowly pulsating B-type star.

As of 2025, Alcyone has not been formally listed as a variable star in the General Catalogue of Variable Stars.

== Companions ==
The Catalog of Components of Double and Multiple Stars lists three companions: B is 24 Tauri, a magnitude 6.28 A0 main-sequence star 117" away; C is V647 Tauri, a δ Sct variable star; and D is a magnitude 9.15 F3 main-sequence star. V647 Tau varies from magnitude +8.25 to +8.30 over 1.13 hours.

The Washington Double Star Catalog lists a further four companions, all fainter than 11th magnitude, and also describes component D as itself double with two nearly equal components separated by 0.30".

Some previous lunar occultation studies found evidence of sub-arcsecond companions, but more recently, a 2021 interferometric study concluded that Alcyone is a single star system.

== See also ==
- Circumstellar disc
- Shell star
- White Tiger
