= Maia (star) =

Star in the Taurus constellation

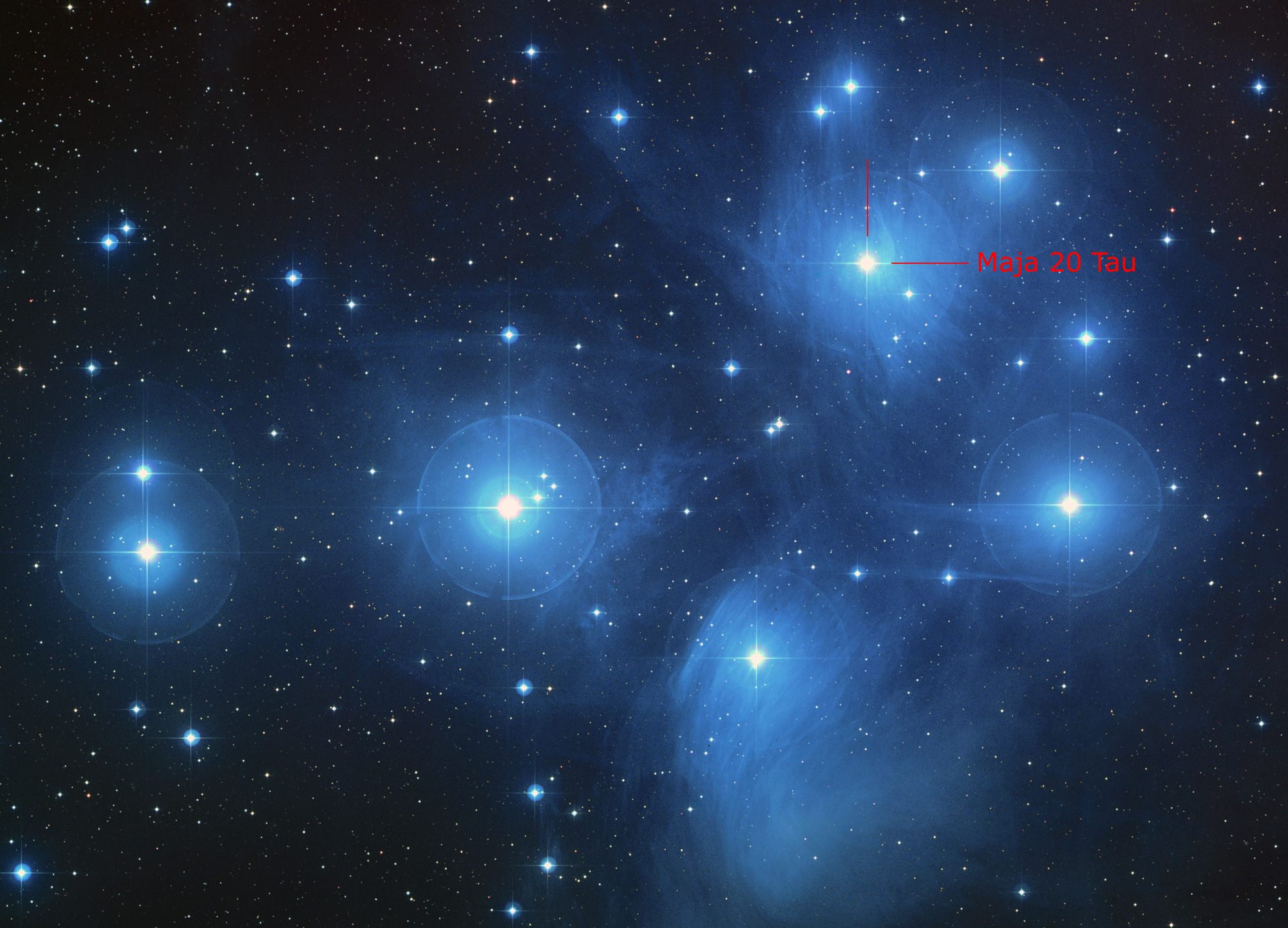
- Maia in the Pleiades cluster Credit: NASA/ESA/AURA/Caltech

Observation data Epoch J2000 Equinox ICRS
- Constellation: Taurus
- Pronunciation: /ˈmeɪə/
- Right ascension: 03^{h} 45^{m} 49.6066^{s}
- Declination: +24° 22′ 03.886″
- Apparent magnitude (V): 3.87

Characteristics
- Spectral type: B8III
- U−B color index: −0.40
- B−V color index: −0.07
- Variable type: Rotating variable

Astrometry
| Radial velocity (R_{v}) | 7.40 km/s |
| Proper motion (μ) | RA: 20.95 mas/yr Dec.: −45.98 mas/yr |
| Parallax (π) | 8.51±0.28 mas |
| Distance | 444 ly (136 pc) |
| Absolute magnitude (M_{V}) | −1.54 |

Details
| Mass | 4.74±0.25 M_{☉} |
| Radius | 6.61±0.11 R_{☉} |
| Luminosity | 501 L_{☉} |
| Surface gravity (log g) | 3.89 cgs |
| Temperature | 12,550±150 K |
| Metallicity [Fe/H] | 1.10 dex |
| Rotational velocity (v sin i) | 33 km/s |
| Age | 126 Myr |

Other designations
- Maia, 20 Tauri, HR 1149, BD+23°516, HD 23408, HIP 17573, SAO 76155, GC 4500, NSV 01279, WDS J03458+2422

Database references
| SIMBAD | data |

Maia /ˈmeɪə/, designated 20 Tauri (abbreviated 20 Tau), is a star in the constellation of Taurus. It is a blue giant of spectral type B8 III, a chemically peculiar star.

Maia is the fourth-brightest star in the Pleiades open star cluster (Messier 45), after Alcyone, Atlas and Electra. It is surrounded by one of the brighter reflection nebulae within the Pleiades, designated NGC 1432 and sometimes called the Maia Nebula.

== Nomenclature ==
The name Maia originates with the Greek: Μαῖα and Latin: Maia. Maia is one of the seven daughters of Atlas and Pleione in Greek mythology—stars which are also included in the Pleiades star cluster. In 2016, the International Astronomical Union organized a Working Group on Star Names (WGSN) to catalog and standardize proper names for stars. The WGSN's first bulletin of July 2016 included a table of the first two batches of names approved by the WGSN; which included Maia for this star. It is now so entered in the IAU Catalog of Star Names.

20 Tauri is the star's Flamsteed designation. Although it is about the 15th brightest star in Taurus, Maia does not have a Bayer designation, but does have the Bright Star Catalogue designation HR 1149 and the Henry Draper Catalogue designation HD 23408. It has been listed as double star WDS J03458+2422; one companion is a 14th magnitude star nearly 2′ away that is probably an unrelated background object. The primary is listed as being double following observations of a lunar occultation, but later observations have failed to find any evidence of it being double.

== Description ==
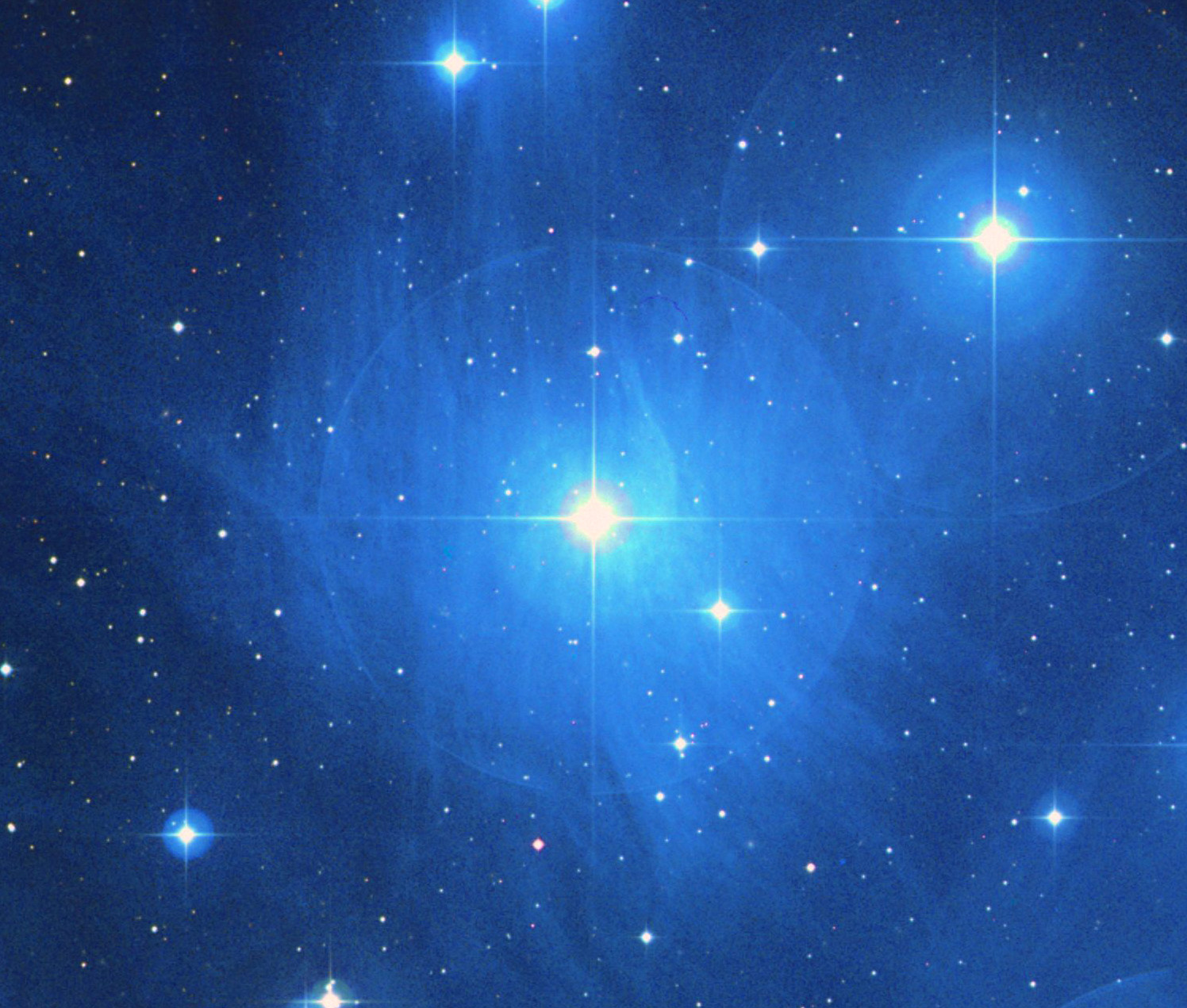
NGC 1432 surrounding Maia

The distance to Maia has been measured by the Gaia spacecraft using the annual parallax method. In Gaia Data Release 2, the parallax is given as 9.4789±0.6827 mas, corresponding to a distance of 106+9
−7 pc. The 2007 new Hipparcos reduction gives a statistically more accurate parallax of 8.51±0.28 mas, indicating a distance of 118±4 pc. Analysis of Gaia parallaxes for the whole Pleiades cluster give an average distance of 136.2±5.0 pc, while VLBI measurements of multiple members give a distance of 136.2±1.2 pc.

Maia's visual magnitude is 3.87, requiring darker skies to be seen. Its bolometric luminosity is 501 times that of the sun, mostly in the ultraviolet, thus suggesting a radius of 3.6 times that of the Sun and a mass of 3.8 solar masses. Interferometric measurements give an angular diameter of 0.451±0.006 mas, suggesting a radius of 6.61 R_{☉} assuming a distance of 136 pc. These measurements also allow the effective temperature to be estimated at 12,550±150 K.

Maia is a chemically peculiar star, meaning it has an unusual surface abundance of some elements as shown by its spectral lines. It is classified as a helium-weak star, but it also shows an excess of some elements including manganese.

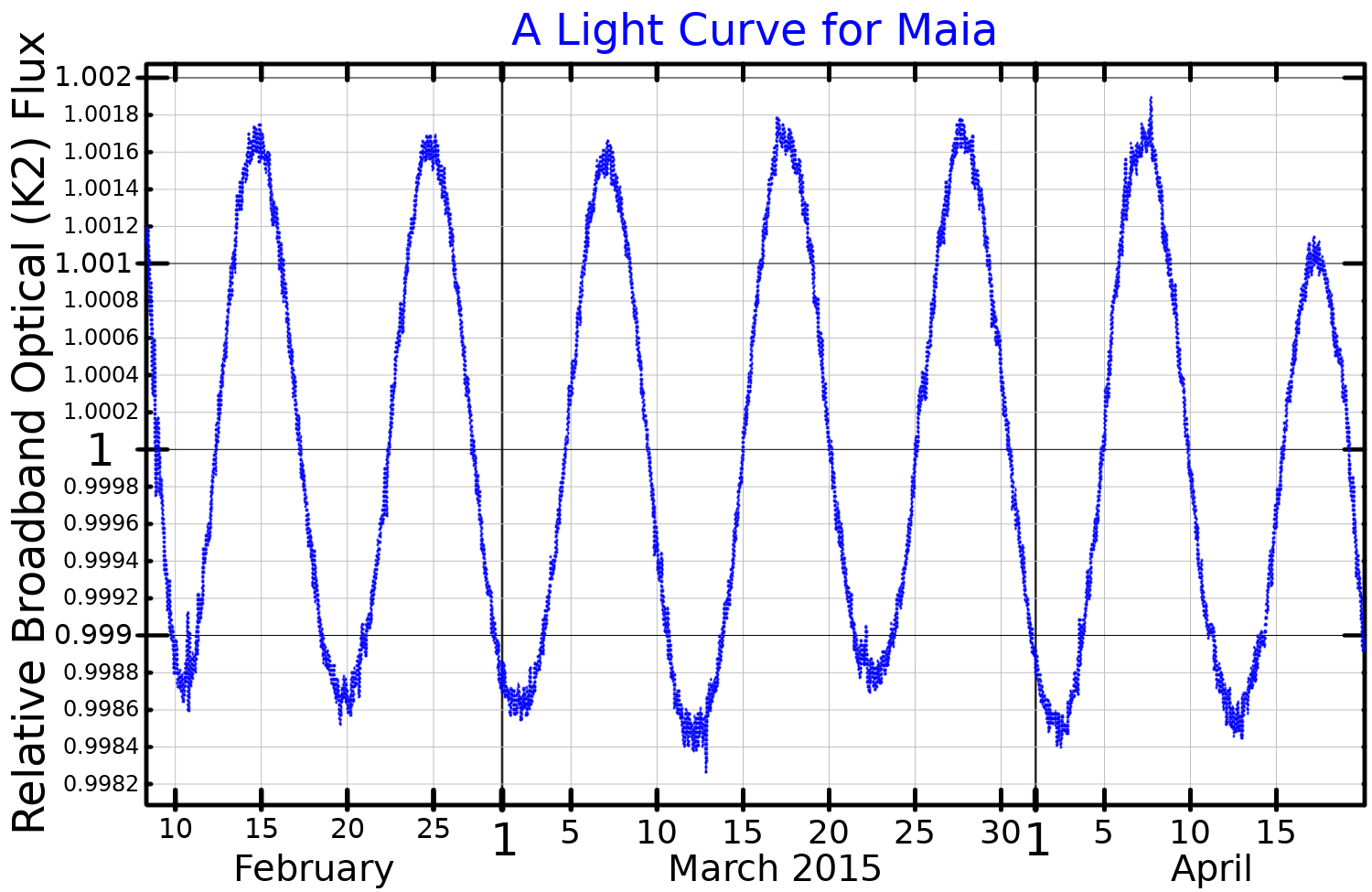
A light curve for Maia, adapted from White et al. (2017)

Maia was thought to be a variable star by astronomer Otto Struve. He proposed a class of stars known as Maia variables, which included Gamma Ursae Minoris. Examination of the Hipparcos data for Maia and some others in the class found no evidence of variability. On the other hand, White et al. found low amplitude, but unambiguous, variability in Maia's brightness as seen by Kepler/K2, with a period of 10.3 days, which they attribute to the rotation of a starspot. Intense study of large numbers of stars suggest that 6.7% of stars with temperatures between 10,000 K and 18,000 K show rapid small-amplitude pulsations but are not members of other variable star classes. These are potentially Maia variables. It is now thought Maia is not a Maia variable, but a rotating variable.

Maia is surrounded by the Maia Nebula (also known as NGC 1432), a reflection nebula that is one of the brightest patches of nebulosity within the Pleiades star cluster. It is the only member of the New General Catalogue discovered photographically.

== Mythology ==
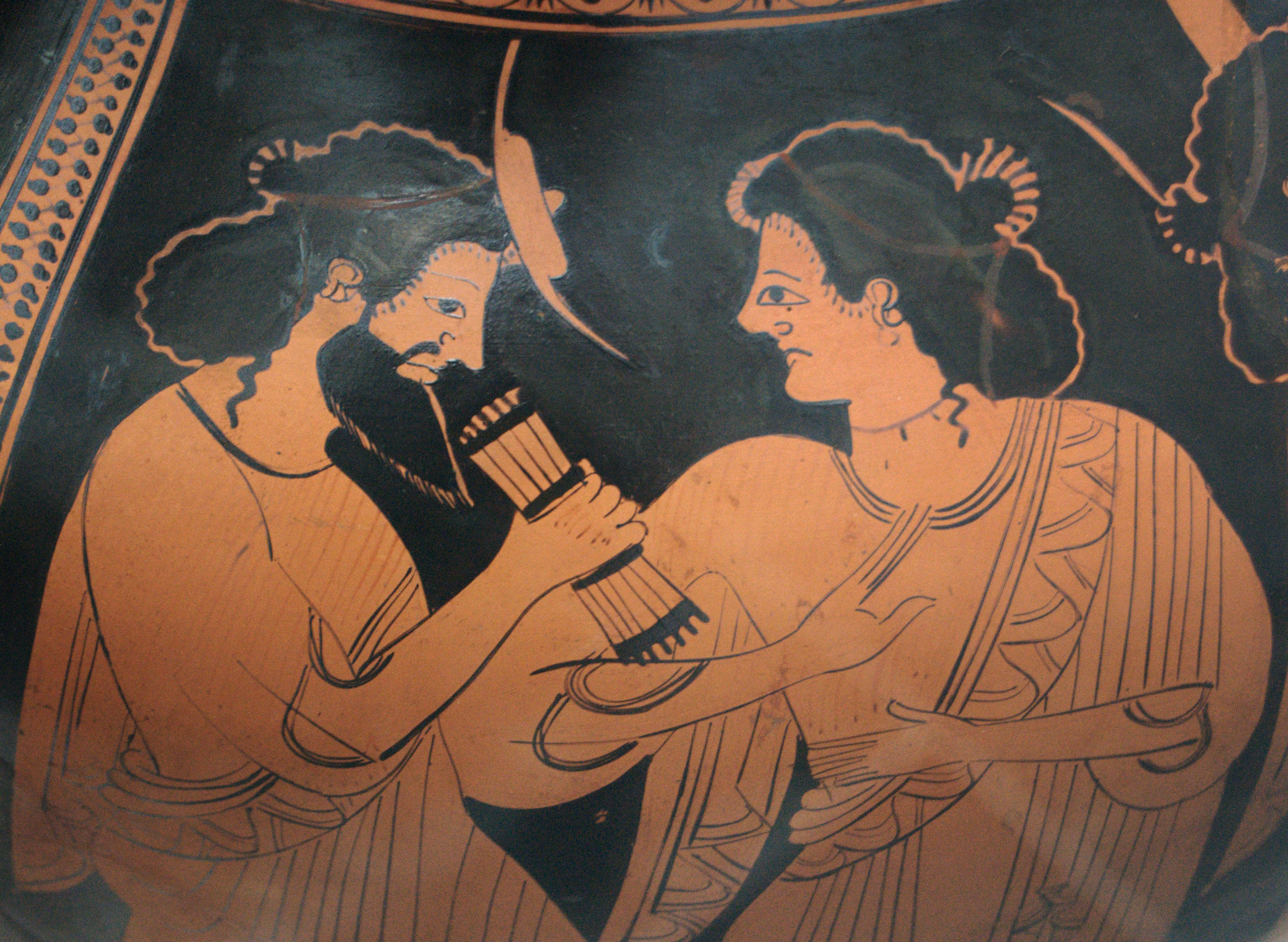
Hermes with his mother Maia. Detail of the side B of an Attic red-figure belly-amphora, ca. 500 BC.

Maia was the oldest of seven beautiful sisters known as the Pleiades. She was impregnated by Zeus, thereby conceiving Hermes, the messenger god. As Maia and the Pleiades are visible in the winter night sky along with the constellation Orion, the Greek myths tell of Maia and her sisters being pursued by the giant huntsman and turned into doves to preserve their safety.
