= 1 Delphini =

Star in the constellation Delphinus

- Location of 1 Delphini (circled)

Observation data Epoch J2000 Equinox ICRS
- Constellation: Delphinus
- A
- Right ascension: 20^{h} 30^{m} 17.9623^{s}
- Declination: +10° 53′ 45.335″
- Apparent magnitude (V): 6.20±0.01
- B
- Right ascension: 20^{h} 30^{m} 17.9505^{s}
- Declination: +10° 53′ 46.244″
- Apparent magnitude (V): 8.00±0.01

Characteristics
- Spectral type: A1:III shell (A0e + A0)
- U−B color index: −0.11
- B−V color index: −0.03

Astrometry
Radial velocity (R_{v})	−15.5 ± 2 km/s
Absolute magnitude (M_{V})	−0.69

A
Proper motion (μ)	RA: +19.320 mas/yr Dec.: +4.645 mas/yr
Parallax (π)	4.6400±0.0616 mas
Distance	703 ± 9 ly (216 ± 3 pc)

B
Proper motion (μ)	RA: +19.545 mas/yr Dec.: +4.710 mas/yr
Parallax (π)	4.1851±0.1421 mas
Distance	780 ± 30 ly (239 ± 8 pc)

Details

A
Mass	3.1±0.3 M_{☉}
Surface gravity (log g)	3.66±0.77 cgs
Temperature	10,651^{+932}_{−1156} K
Metallicity [Fe/H]	0.00 dex
Rotational velocity (v sin i)	217 km/s
Age	246 Myr

B
Surface gravity (log g)	4.14^{+0.19}_{−0.47} cgs
Rotational velocity (v sin i)	370 km/s

Other designations
- 1 Delphini, BD+10°4303, HD 195325, HIP 101160, HR 7836, SAO 106172, WDS J20303+1054AB

Database references
SIMBAD	data

1 Delphini (1 Del) is the Flamsteed designation for a close binary star in the northern constellation of Delphinus. With a combined apparent magnitude of 6.08, it is barely visible to the naked eye, even under ideal conditions. Parallax measurements put the components at a distance 703 and 780 light years respectively. However, its approaching the Solar System with a radial velocity of 15 km/s.

1 Del consists of three components. The brightest of them has a magnitude of 6.1; a companion located around 0.9 arcseconds from the primary has an apparent magnitude of 8.1; and a third star, located much farther away at around 17 arcseconds from component A, is the faintest with a magnitude of around 14 and is an unrelated background object.

The entire system has a stellar classification of A1: III sh, indicating that it is a white giant and a shell star. However, there is some uncertainty about the temperature class. When resolved, the secondary has a class of B9. 1 Del A has 3 times the mass of the Sun and an effective temperature of 10,651 K, giving it a bluish white glow. It is estimated to be almost 250 million years old and has a solar metallicity. Both components spin rapidly, with projected rotational velocities of 217 and 370 km/s respectively. As for the peculiarities, the shell star is a primary component; the spectrum of the secondary shows broad absorption lines.

Due to the stability of the emission lines data from 1 Delphini has been used for developing models of shell stars and Be stars.
