= LQ Andromedae =

Star in the constellation Andromeda

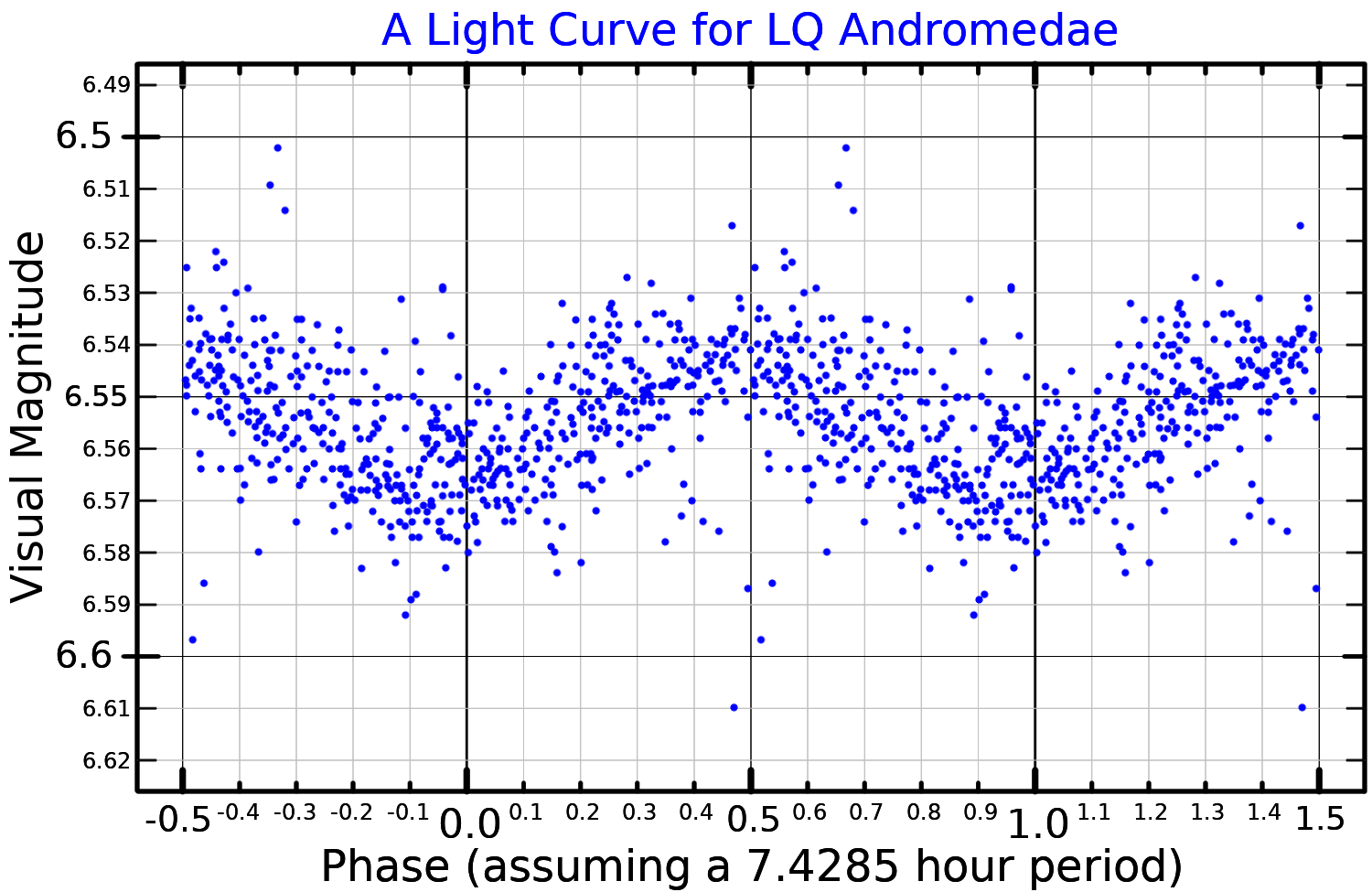
- A visual band light curve for LQ Andromedae, adapted from Harmanec et al. (1991)

Observation data Epoch J2000 Equinox ICRS
- Constellation: Andromeda
- Right ascension: 23^{h} 58^{m} 46.4391^{s}
- Declination: +46° 24′ 47.44272″
- Apparent magnitude (V): 6.50 – 6.66 variable

Characteristics
- Spectral type: B4Ven
- Apparent magnitude (U): 5.84
- Apparent magnitude (B): 6.444
- Apparent magnitude (V): 6.538
- Apparent magnitude (G): 6.4666
- Apparent magnitude (J): 6.588
- Apparent magnitude (H): 6.617
- Apparent magnitude (K): 6.545
- B−V color index: 0.098
- Variable type: Be star

Astrometry
Radial velocity (R_{v})	−51.27±0.42 km/s
Proper motion (μ)	RA: 15.419±0.081 mas/yr Dec.: 0.574±0.060 mas/yr
Parallax (π)	2.4169±0.0519 mas
Distance	1,350 ± 30 ly (414 ± 9 pc)

Orbit
Period (P)	7.413 days

Details
Mass	7±1 M_{☉}
Radius	4.8±0.6 R_{☉}
Luminosity (bolometric)	2,559 L_{☉}
Surface gravity (log g)	3.49±0.37 cgs
Temperature	17260±520 K
Rotational velocity (v sin i)	300±25 km/s

Other designations
- 2MASS J23584644+4624474, BD+45 4381, HD 224559, HIP 118214, HR 9070, SAO 53540, TYC 3639-164-1

Database references
SIMBAD	data

LQ Andromedae (shortened as LQ And, also known as HR 9070 in the Bright Star Catalogue) is a variable star in the constellation Andromeda. Its maximum apparent visual magnitude is 6.5, placing it at the limit of the visibility to the naked eye. The brightness, however, drops down to 6.66 with a periodic cycle of roughly 7.44 hours.

The stellar classification of this star is B4Ven, so it is a main sequence star that shows emission lines and broadened absorption lines induced by the fast projected rotational velocity of 300 km/s (the angle between the rotation axis and our line of sight has been estimated with a value of 72°). This leads to the classification of the star as a Be star. Further proof is the compatibility between the rotational and luminosity variability periods.

LQ Andromedae is also a spectroscopic binary with an orbital period of 7.413 days. Not much is known about the secondary component, but it is likely a low-mass companion (M<0.5 M_{☉}). A circumstellar disk is also present in the system.
