= Pleione =

Pleione may refer to:

- Pleione (mythology), a figure in Greek mythology
- Pleione (star), a star belonging to the Pleiades star cluster
- Pleione (plant), a genus mainly of ground orchids. Prefer to grow on tree-trunks and in rock crevices
