= Pleione (star) =

Binary star in the Pleiades star cluster

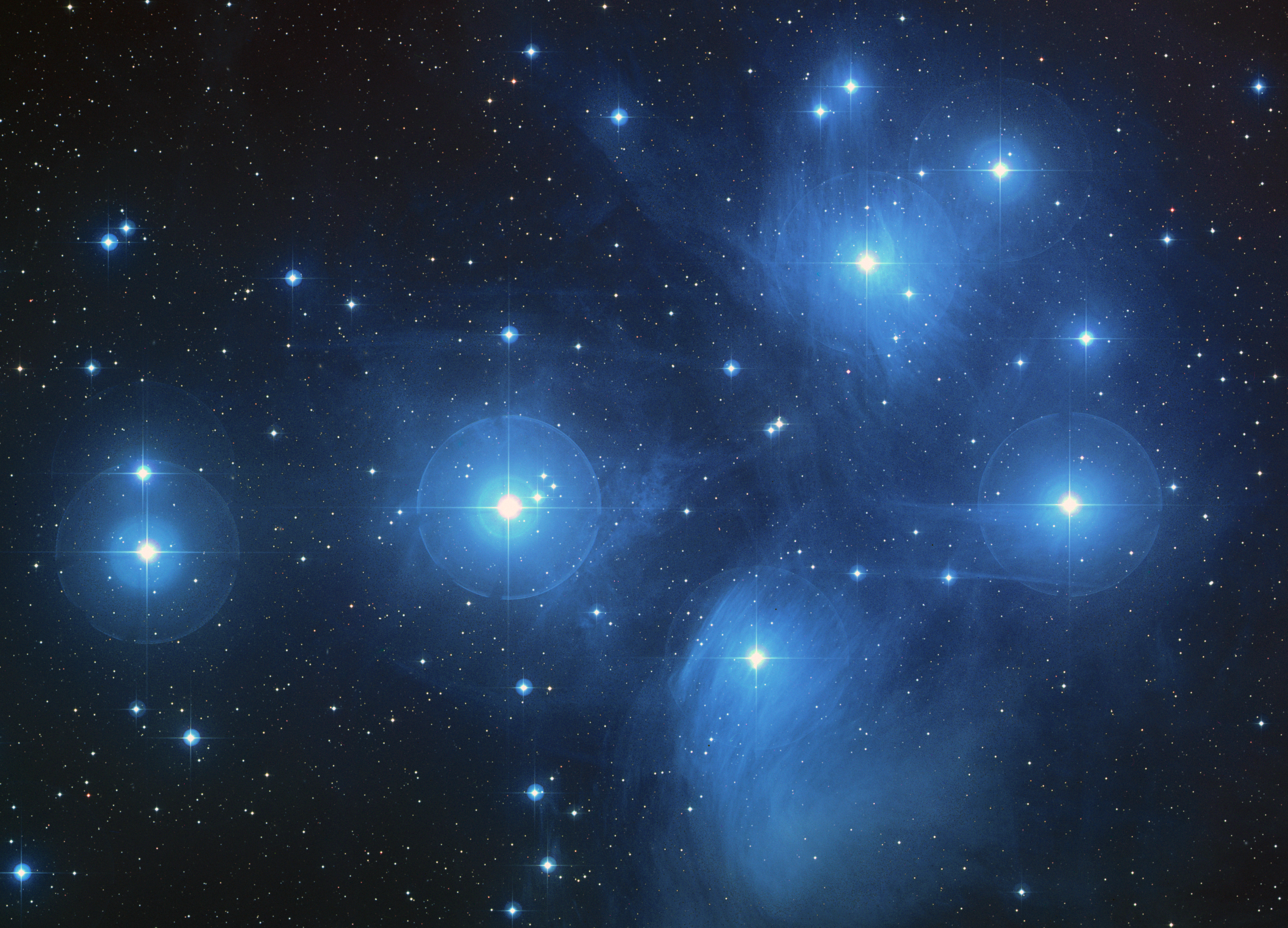
- Pleione (circled) is located just above Atlas in the East of the Pleiades cluster.

Observation data Epoch J2000 Equinox ICRS
- Constellation: Taurus
- Right ascension: 03^{h} 49^{m} 11.2166^{s}
- Declination: +24° 08′ 12.157″
- Apparent magnitude (V): 4.77 - 5.50

Characteristics
- Evolutionary stage: Main sequence
- Spectral type: B8Vne
- B−V color index: −0.08
- Variable type: γ Cas

Astrometry
Radial velocity (R_{v})	5.10 km/s
Proper motion (μ)	RA: 19.496 mas/yr Dec.: −47.650 mas/yr
Parallax (π)	7.2414±0.1255 mas
Distance	450 ± 8 ly (138 ± 2 pc)
Absolute magnitude (M_{V})	−0.347

Details
Mass	2.888 M_{☉}
Radius	4.17±0.17 R_{☉}
Luminosity	184 L_{☉}
Surface gravity (log g)	3.087 cgs
Temperature	11,058 K
Metallicity [Fe/H]	+0.02 dex
Rotational velocity (v sin i)	290 km/s
Age	125 Myr

Other designations
- Pleione, 28 Tau, BU Tau, BD+23°558, GC 4587, HD 23862, HIP 17851, HR 1180, SAO 76229

Database references
SIMBAD	data

Pleione (Note: Pronounced /ˈplaɪəniː/ PLY-anee or /ˈpliːəniː/ PLEE-ənee) is a binary star system in the Pleiades star cluster, within the constellation of Taurus. It has the variable star designation BU Tauri (BU Tau) and the Flamsteed designation 28 Tauri (28 Tau). Pleione is located close on the sky to the brighter star Atlas, so is difficult for stargazers to distinguish with the naked eye despite being a fifth magnitude star.

The brighter star of the Pleione binary pair, component A, is a hot type B star 184 times more luminous than the Sun. It is classified as Be star with certain distinguishing traits: periodic phase changes and a complex circumstellar environment composed of two gaseous disks at different angles to each other. The primary star rotates rapidly, close to its breakup velocity, even faster than Achernar. Although some research on the companion star has been performed, stellar characteristics of the orbiting B component are not well known.

== Nomenclature ==
28 Tauri is the star's Flamsteed designation and BU Tauri its variable star designation. The name Pleione originates with Greek mythology; she is the mother of seven daughters known as the Pleiades. In 2016, the International Astronomical Union organized a Working Group on Star Names (WGSN) to catalog and standardize proper names for stars. The WGSN's first bulletin of July 2016 included a table of the first two batches of names approved by the WGSN; which included Pleione for this star. It is now so entered in the IAU Catalog of Star Names.

== Visibility ==
The location of the Pleiades (circled) in the constellation Taurus.

With an apparent magnitude of +5.05 in V, the star is rather difficult to make out with the naked eye, especially since its close neighbour Atlas is 3.7 times brighter and located less than 5 arcminutes away. (Note: The brightness ratio of Atlas versus Pleione is derived from the formula for apparent magnitude and is based on their respective visual magnitudes: Atlas (${m_A}$) at 3.62 and Pleione (${m_P}$) at 5.05. Therefore: $$\frac{m_A}{m_P}=2.512^{(5.05-3.62)}=3.73$$) Beginning in October of each year, Pleione along with the rest of the cluster can be seen rising in the east in the early morning before dawn. To see it after sunset, one will need to wait until December. By mid-February, the star is visible to virtually every inhabited region of the globe, with only those south of 66° unable to see it. Even in cities like Cape Town, South Africa, at the tip of the African continent, the star rises almost 32° above the horizon. Due to its declination of roughly +24°, Pleione is circumpolar in the Northern Hemisphere at latitudes greater than 66° North. Once late April arrives, the cluster can be spotted briefly in the deepening twilight of the western horizon, soon to disappear with the other setting stars.

Pleione apparently became significantly dimmer sometime between the 17th and 19th centuries. In 1937, William A. Calder discovered that the star's brightness was still varying by a small amount (~1/6 magnitude). Pleione is now classified as a Gamma Cassiopeiae type variable star, with brightness fluctuations that range between a 4.8 and 5.5 visual magnitude. It has a spectral classification of B8Vne, a hot main sequence star with "nebulous" absorption lines due to its rapid rotation and emission lines from the surrounding circumstellar disks formed of material being ejected from the star.

There has been significant debate as to the star's actual distance from Earth. The debate revolves around the different methodologies to measure distance—parallax being the most central, but photometric and spectroscopic observations yielding valuable insights as well. Before the Hipparcos mission, the estimated distance for the Pleiades star cluster was around 135 parsecs or 440 light years. When the Hipparcos Catalogue was published in 1997, the new parallax measurement indicated a much closer distance of about 119±1.0 pc (388±3.2 ly), triggering substantial controversy among astronomers. The Hipparcos new reduction produced a broadly similar distance of 120±2 pc. If the Hipparcos estimate were accurate, some astronomers contend, then stars in the cluster would have to be fainter than Sun-like stars—a notion that would challenge some of the fundamental precepts of stellar structure. Interferometric measurements taken in 2004 by the Hubble Telescope's Fine Guidance Sensors and corroborated by studies from Caltech and NASA's Jet Propulsion Laboratory showed the original estimate of 135 pc or 440 ly to be the correct figure. The Gaia EDR3 parallax is 7.24±0.1255 mas, indicating a distance around 138 pc. This is relatively imprecise for a Gaia result due to the brightness of the star, but still with a statistical margin of error similar to the Hipparcos results.

== Properties ==
In 1942 Otto Struve, one of the early researchers of Be Stars, stated that Pleione is "the most interesting member of the Pleiades cluster". Like many of the stars in the cluster, Pleione is a blue-white B-type main sequence star with a temperature of about 11,000 K. It has a bolometric luminosity of 184 L_{☉} assuming a distance of roughly 130 pc. With a radius of 3.7 R_{☉} and mass that is 2.9 M_{☉}, Pleione is considerably smaller than the brightest stars in the Pleiades. Alcyone for instance has a radius that is 10 R_{☉} with a luminosity 2,400 L_{☉}, making it roughly 30 times more voluminous than Pleione and about 13 times brighter. (Note: The relative size of Alcyone (V_{A}) compared to Pleione (V_{P}) is determined by comparing their volumes. It is assumed that the volume of each star is reasonably approximated by the formula for a sphere: V_{A} ≈ 4/3π × 10^{3} ≈ 4,188.79 V_{Sun} V_{P} ≈ 4/3π × 3.2^{3} ≈ 137.26 V_{Sun} Therefore, the volume of Alcyone compared to Pleione ≈ 4,188.79 ÷ 137.26 ≈ 30.52 Alcyone's luminosity compared to Pleione is: 2,400L_{☉} ÷ 190L_{☉} = 12.63 (or 13 rounded))

=== Be star ===
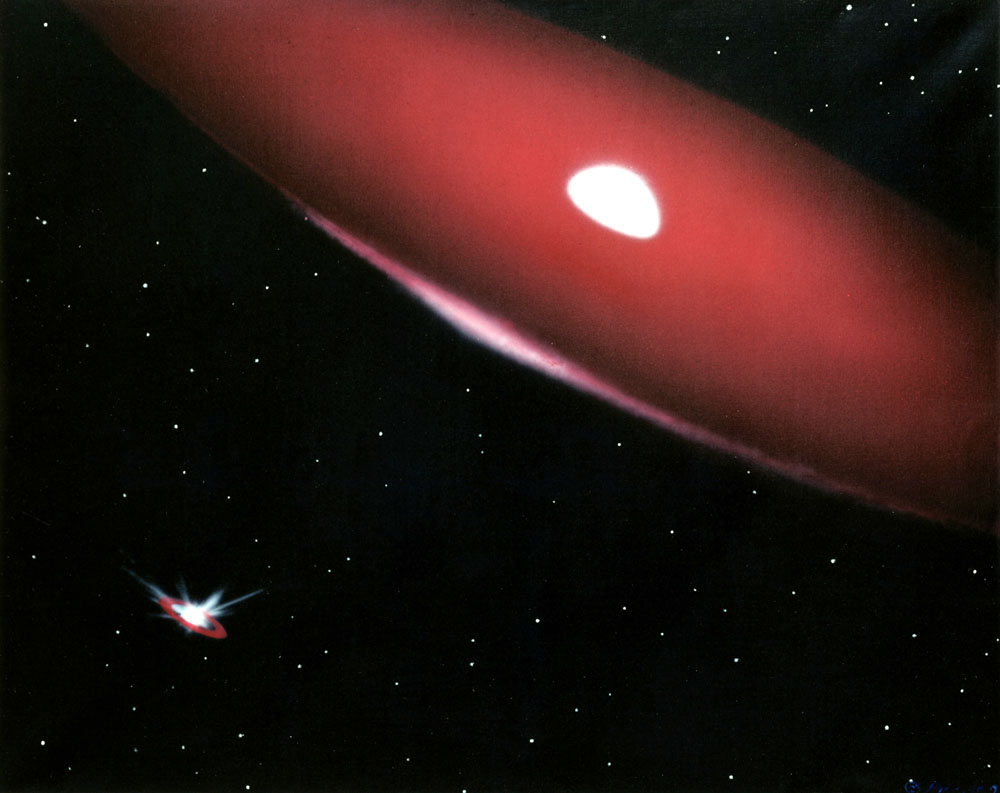
Artist's impression of the Phi Persei system. Classical Be stars like Pleione and Phi Persei exhibit gaseous equatorial disks, likely caused by rapid rotation.

Pleione is a classical Be star, often referred to as an "active hot star". Classical Be stars are B-type stars close to the main sequence with the "e" in the spectral type signifying that Pleione exhibits emission lines in its spectrum, rather than the absorption lines typical of B-type stars. Emission lines usually indicate that a star is surrounded by gas. In the case of a Be star, the gas is typically in the form of an equatorial disk, resulting in electromagnetic radiation that emanates not just from the photosphere, but from the disk as well. The geometry and kinematics of this gaseous circumstellar environment are best explained by a Keplerian disk – one that is supported against gravity by rotation, rather than gas or radiation pressure. Circumstellar disks like this are sometimes referred to as "decretion disks", because they consist of material being thrown off the star (as opposed to accretion disks which comprise material falling toward the star).

Be Stars are fast rotators (>200 km/s), causing them to be highly oblate, with a substantial stellar wind and high mass loss rate. Pleione's rotational velocity of 329 km/s is considerably faster than the 251 km/s of Achernar, a prototypical Be star. Pleione revolves on its axis once every 11.8 hours, compared to 48.4 hours for Achernar. (Note: The time it takes for Achernar (T_{A}) and Pleione (T_{P}) to rotate on its own axis is determined by taking the star's radius in solar units, multiplying by the Sun's radius in kilometers, then calculating the star's circumference at the equator and dividing by its speed of rotation per hour. Therefore: T_{A} = 10 R_{☉} × 696,000 km × 2 × π ÷ 251 km/s ÷ 3,600 ≈ 48.4 hrs T_{P} = 3.2 R_{☉} × 696,000 km × 2 × π ÷ 329 km/s ÷ 3,600 ≈ 11.8 hrs) For comparison, the Sun takes 25.3 days to rotate. Pleione is spinning so fast that it is close to the estimated breakup velocity for a B8V star of about 370–390 km/s, which is why it is losing so much mass.

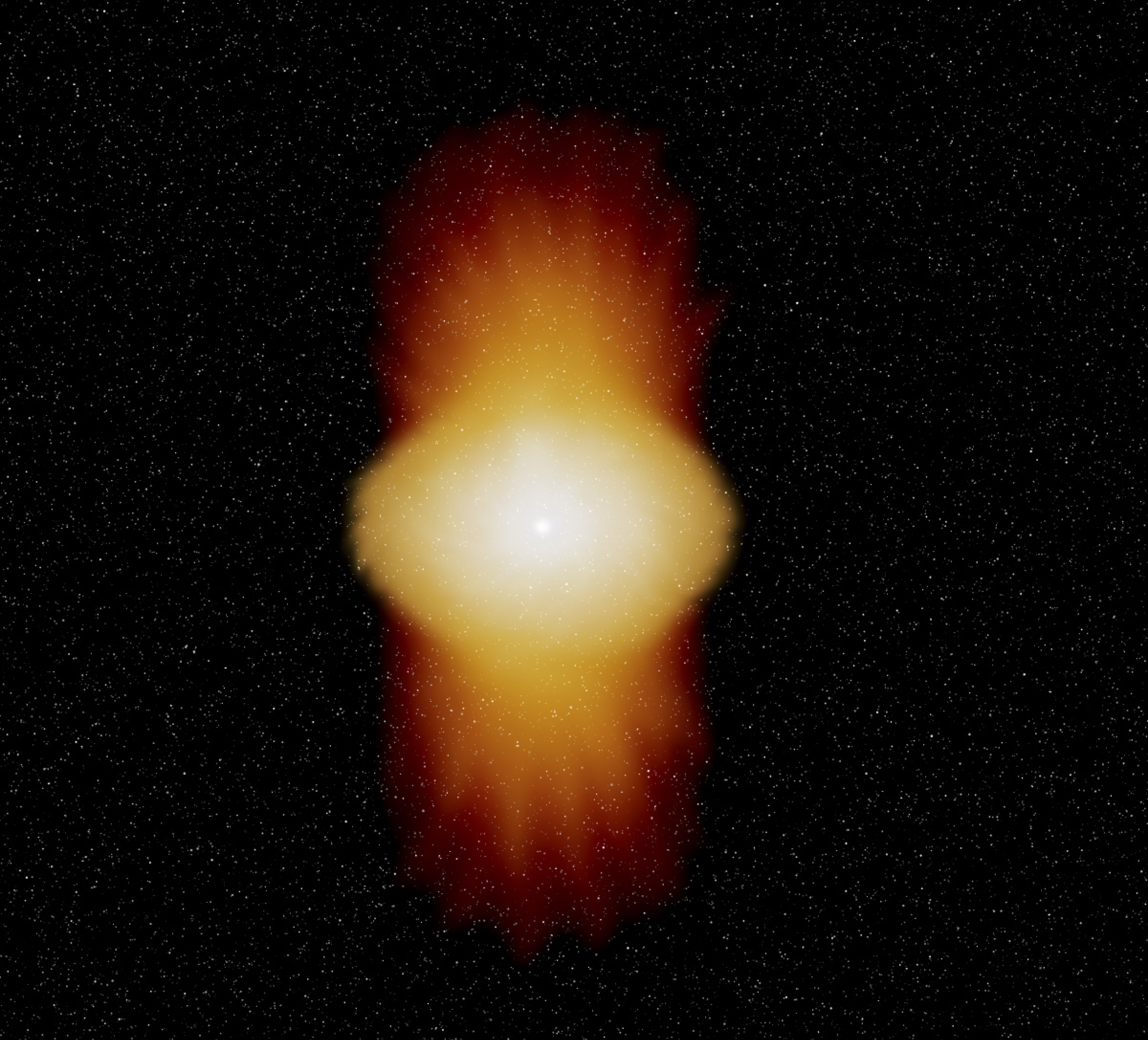
Artist's impression of Alpha Arae rotating with a velocity close to breakup and losing mass through a stellar wind emerging from the poles.

Pleione is unusual because it alternates between three different phases: 1) normal B star, 2) Be star and 3) Be shell star. The cause is changes in the decretion disc, which appears, disappears, and reforms. Material in the disc is pulled back towards the star by gravity, but if it has enough energy it can escape into space, contributing to the stellar wind. Sometimes, Be stars form multiple decretion discs simultaneously, producing complex circumstellar dynamics.

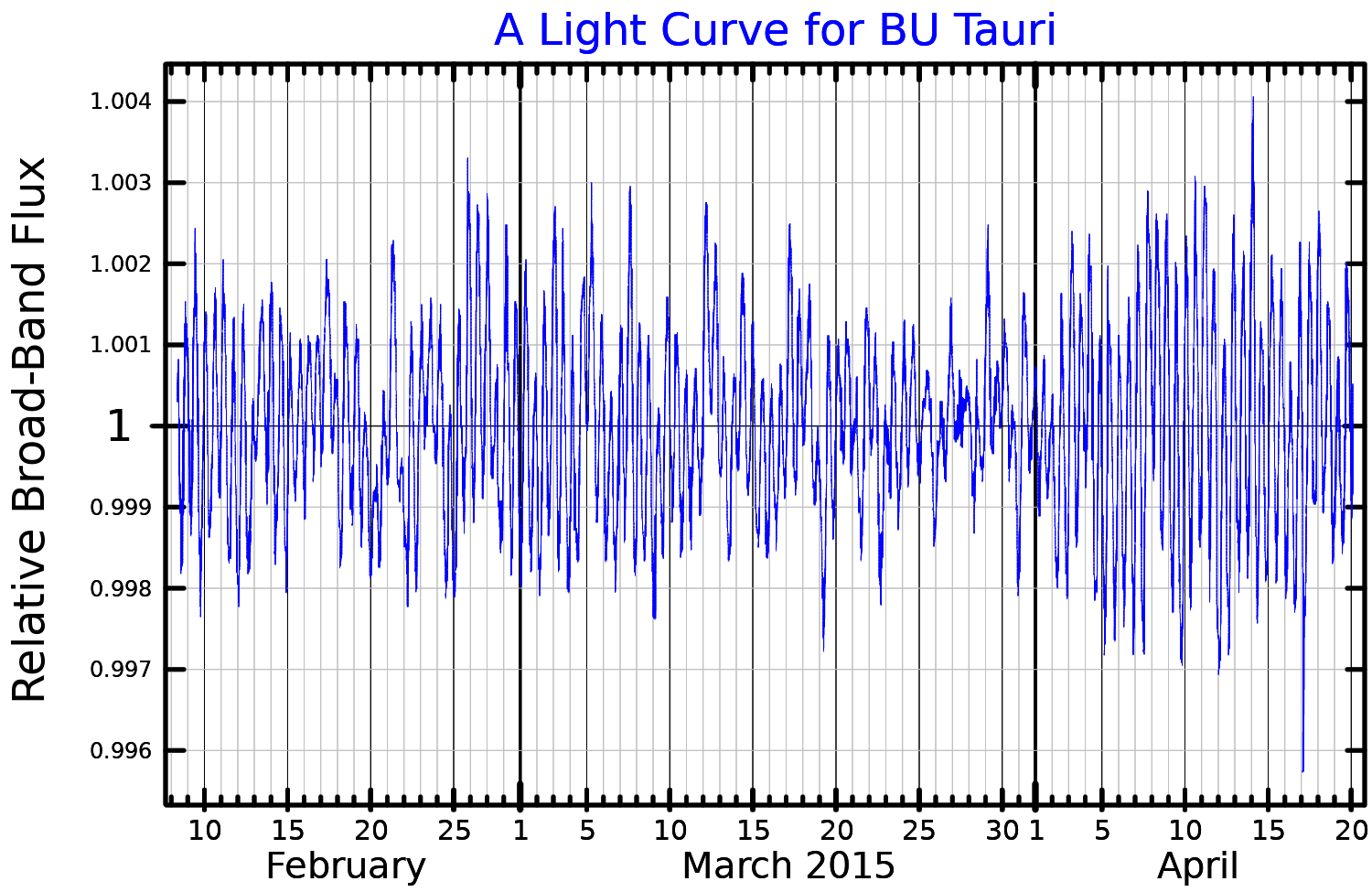
Broad-band optical light curve for Pleione

As a result of such dynamics, Pleione exhibits prominent long-term photometric and spectroscopic variations encompassing a period of about 35 years. During the 20th century, Pleione went through several phase changes: it was in a Be phase until 1903, a B phase (1905–1936), a B-shell phase (1938–1954), followed by another Be phase (1955–1972). It then returned to the Be-shell phase in 1972, developing numerous shell absorption lines in its spectrum. At the same time, the star showed a decrease in brightness, beginning at the end of 1971. After reaching a minimum brightness in late 1973, the star gradually re-brightened. In 1989, Pleione entered a Be phase which lasted until the summer of 2005.

These phase changes are ascribed to the evolution of a decretion disc that formed in 1972. Polarimetric observations show the intrinsic polarization angle has changed, indicating a change in orientation of the disc axis. Because Pleione has a stellar companion with a close orbit, the shift in the polarization angle has been attributed to the companion causing a precession (wobble) of the disk, with a precession period of roughly 81 years.

Photometric and spectroscopic observations from 2005 to 2007 indicated that a new disc had formed around the equator – producing a two discs at different inclination angles (60° and 30°). Such a misaligned double-disc structure had not been observed around other Be stars.

== Star system ==
Pleione is known to be a speckle binary, although its orbital parameters have yet to be fully established. In 1996 a group of Japanese and French astronomers discovered that Pleione is a single-lined spectroscopic binary with an orbital period of 218.0 days and a large eccentricity of 0.6. The Washington Double Star Catalogue lists an angular separation between the two components of 0.2 arcseconds—an angle which equates to a distance of about 24 AU, assuming a distance of 120 parsecs.

== Ethnological influences ==
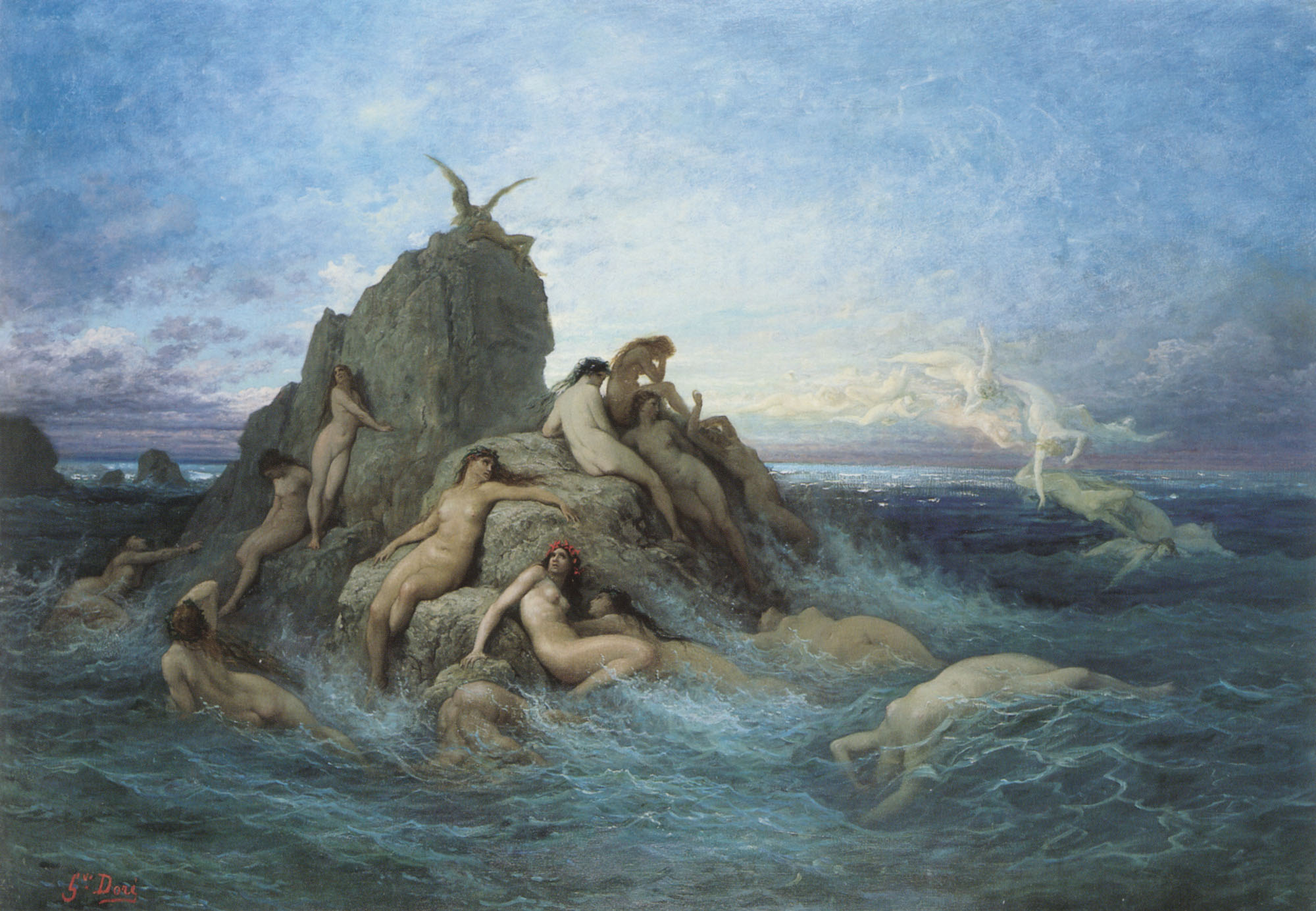
Depiction of Pleione as an Oceanid nymph. Painting from French artist Gustave Doré.

=== Mythology ===
Pleione was an Oceanid nymph of Mount Kyllene in Arkadia (southern Greece), one of the three thousand daughters of the Titans Oceanus and Tethys. The nymphs in Greek mythology were the spirits of nature; oceanids, spirits of the sea. Though considered lesser divinities, they were still very much venerated as the protectors of the natural world. Each oceanid was thence a patroness of a particular body of water — be it ocean, river, lake, spring or even cloud — and by extension activities related thereto. The sea-nymph, Pleione, was the consort of Atlas, the Titan, and mother of the Hyas, Hyades and Pleiades.

=== Etymology ===
When names were assigned to the stars in the Pleiades cluster, the bright pair of stars in the East of the cluster were named Atlas and Pleione, while the seven other bright stars were named after the mythological Pleiades (the 'Seven Sisters'). The term "Pleiades" was used by Valerius Flaccus to apply to the cluster as a whole, and Riccioli called the star Mater Pleione.

There is some diversity of opinion as to the origin of the names Pleione and Pleiades. There are three possible derivations of note. Foremost is that both names come from the Greek word πλεῖν, (pr. ple'-ō), meaning "to sail". This is particularly plausible given that ancient Greece was a seafaring culture and because of Pleione's mythical status as an Oceanid nymph. Pleione, as a result, is sometimes referred to as the "sailing queen" while her daughters the "sailing ones". Also, the appearance of these stars coincided with the sailing season in antiquity; sailors were well advised to set sail only when the Pleiades were visible at night, lest they meet with misfortune.

Another derivation of the name is the Greek word Πλειόνη (pr. plêionê), meaning "more", "plenty", or "full"—a lexeme with many English derivatives like pleiotropy, pleomorphism, pleonasm, pleonexia, plethora and Pliocene. This meaning also coincides with the biblical Kīmāh and the Arabic word for the Pleiades — Al Thurayya. In fact, Pleione may have been numbered amongst the Epimelides (nymphs of meadows and pastures) and presided over the multiplication of the animals, as her name means "to increase in number".

Finally, the last comes from Peleiades (Ancient Greek: Πελειάδες, lit. 'doves'), a reference to the sisters' mythical transformation by Zeus into a flock of doves following their pursuit by Orion, the giant huntsman, across the heavens.

=== Modern legacy ===
In the best-selling 1955 nature book published by Time-Life called The World We Live In, there is an artist's impression of Pleione entitled Purple Pleione. The illustration is from the famed space artist Chesley Bonestell and carries the caption: "Purple Pleione, a star of the familiar Pleiades cluster, rotates so rapidly that it has flattened into a flying saucer and hurled forth a dark red ring of hydrogen. Where the excited gas crosses Pleione's equator, it obscures her violet light."

Given its mythical connection with sailing and orchids, the name Pleione is often associated with grace, speed and elegance. Some of the finest designs in racing yachts have the name Pleione, and the recent Shanghai Oriental Art Center draws its inspiration from an orchid. Fat Jon in his new album Hundred Eight Stars has a prismatic track dedicated to 28 Tauri.

== See also ==
- List of stars in the constellation Taurus
- Class B Stars
- Be stars
- Shell star
- Circumstellar disk
