= Gamma Cassiopeiae variable =

Type of eruptive variable star

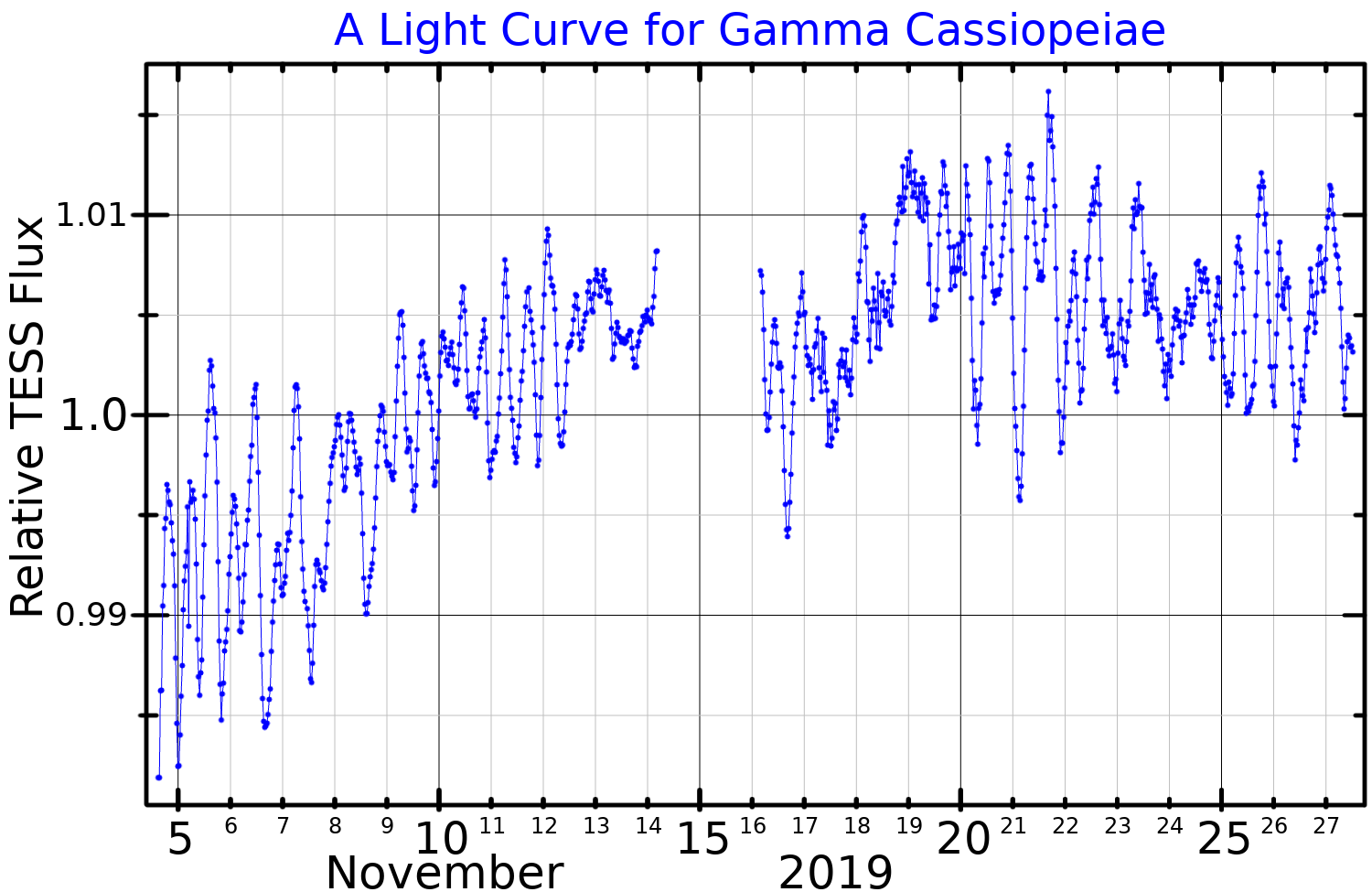
A light curve for Gamma Cassiopeiae, plotted from data published by Labadie-Bartz et al. (2021)

A Gamma Cassiopeiae variable (γ Cassiopeiae variable) is a type of variable star, named for its prototype γ Cassiopeiae.

== Variability ==
The General Catalogue of Variable Stars (GCVS) categorises γ Cassiopeiae stars as eruptive variables and describes them as rapidly-rotating B class giants or subgiants, although many of them are main sequence stars. It distinguishes them from those Be stars that only show smaller amplitude brightness variations. The GCVS uses the code GCAS to denote γ Cassiopeiae variables.

γ Cassiopeiae variables show irregular changes in brightness on a timescale of decades. These typically have amplitudes of the order of a magnitude. For example, γ Cassiopeiae is usually about magnitude 2.5 and has varied between magnitudes 1.6 and 3.0. The variations are associated with changes in the spectrum between normal absorption spectra and Be star spectra, often also including shell star characteristics.

Pleione and γ Cassiopeiae itself are both variable stars that have intermittent shell episodes where strong shell features appear in the spectrum and the brightness increases or decreases significantly. At other times the shell is not detectable in the spectrum, and even the emission lines may disappear.

== Mechanism ==
γ Cassiopeiae variables are understood to be hot stars which have equatorial decretion disks which periodically disappear and reform, or possibly just change dramatically in scale. They are probably all very rapid rotators and most can be classified as Be stars. They are often also shell stars at least part of the time, where the disk is seen edge-on and produces very narrow absorption lines in addition to the broader photospheric lines and possible emission lines. Regardless of whether they are shell stars by the most narrow definition, the periods when they produce strong disks and increase in brightness are known as shell events.

== Examples ==
Gamma Cassiopeiae variables are inherently luminous and relatively common, so there are many naked-eye examples.

Designation (name)	Constellation	Apparent magnitude (Maximum)^{[A]}	Apparent magnitude (Minimum)^{[A]}	Range of magnitude	Period	Spectral class	Comment
Gamma Cassiopeiae (Tiansi)	Cassiopeia	1^{m}.6	3^{m}.0	1.4		B0.5 IVe	Prototype
Delta Scorpii A (Dschubba)	Scorpius	1^{m}.59	2^{m}.32	0.73		B0.3 IV	
Kappa Canis Majoris	Canis Major	3^{m}.40	3^{m}.97	0.57		B1.5IVne	
Beta Canis Minoris (Gomeisa)	Canis Minor	2^{m}.84	2^{m}.92	0.08		B8V e	
FW Canis Majoris	Canis Major	5^{m}.00	5^{m}.50	0.50			
Zeta Ophiuchi	Ophiuchus	2^{m}.56	2^{m}.58	0.02		O9.5V	Also a Beta Cephei variable
Pleione	Taurus	4^{m}.77	5^{m}.5	0.77		B8Vne	
Lambda Pavonis	Pavo	4^{m}.00	4^{m}.26	0.26		B2II-IIIe	
Phi Persei (Dajiangjunbei)	Perseus	3^{m}.96	4^{m}.11	0.15	19.5 d	B2Vpe	
Psi Persei	Perseus	4^{m}.17	4^{m}.36	0.19		B5III-Vne	
X Persei	Perseus	6^{m}.03	7^{m}.0	0.97		B0Ve	Also a high-mass X-ray binary

^{A} (visual magnitude, unless marked (B) (= blue) or (p) (= photographic))
