= Shell star =

Type of star

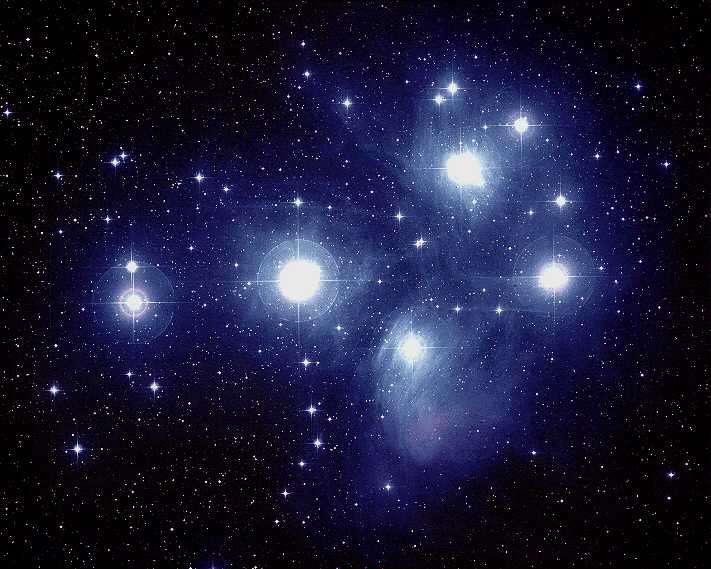
Pleione in the Pleiades is a shell star.

A shell star is a star having a spectrum that shows extremely broad absorption lines, plus some very narrow absorption lines. They typically also show some emission lines, usually from the Balmer series but occasionally of other lines. The broad absorption lines are due to rapid rotation of the photosphere, the emission lines from an equatorial disk, and the narrow absorption lines are produced when the disc is seen nearly edge-on.

Shell stars have spectral types O7.5 to F5, with rotation velocities of 200–300 km/s, not far from the point when the rotational acceleration would disrupt the star.

== Spectrum ==
The shell stars are defined as a group by the existence of rotationally broadened photospheric spectral lines in combination with very narrow absorption lines. Emission lines are frequently present but not regarded as a defining feature. The exact spectral lines present vary to some extent: Balmer emission lines are very common, but may be weak or absent in cooler stars; FeII lines are common but not always present; helium lines may be seen in the hottest stars. The photospheric lines are rotationally broadened showing projected velocities of 200 km/s or more.

The line profiles in shell star spectra are complex, with variable wings, cores, and superpositions of absorption and emission features. In some cases, particular absorption of emission features are only visible as modifications to a line profile, or a weakening of another line. This leads to double and triple-peaked lines, or asymmetric lines.

Shell stars very commonly have emission lines and thus are often Be stars, although they can also occur in spectral classes O, A, and occasionally F.

== Subtypes ==
Shell stars have been subdivided into four categories, although these categories are no longer recognised as meaningful and are rarely seen in modern publications:

- early Be stars of spectral types O7.5 to B2.5
- middle Be stars of types B3 to B6.5,
- late Be stars of types B7 to B9.5, and
- A-F shell stars ranging from A0 to F5.

The vast majority of known shell stars are of spectral class B. However, partly because of this many cooler shell stars have remained undetected. The Be phenomenon, and hence the term Be star itself, is now widely applied to similar stars not only of spectral class B, but also A and sometimes O and F.

== Variability ==
Shell stars often show variability in their spectra and brightness. The shell features may come and go, with the star changing from a shell star to a normal B star or Be star. Shell stars which show irregular variability due to changes in, or the disappearance of, the "shell" are called Gamma Cassiopeiae variables. Pleione and Gamma Cassiopeiae itself are both variable stars that have intermittent shell episodes where strong shell features appear in the spectrum and the brightness increases or decreases significantly. At other times the shell is not detectable in the spectrum, and even the emission lines may disappear.

== See also ==
- 1 Delphini
