= Pleiades =

Star cluster in the constellation of Taurus

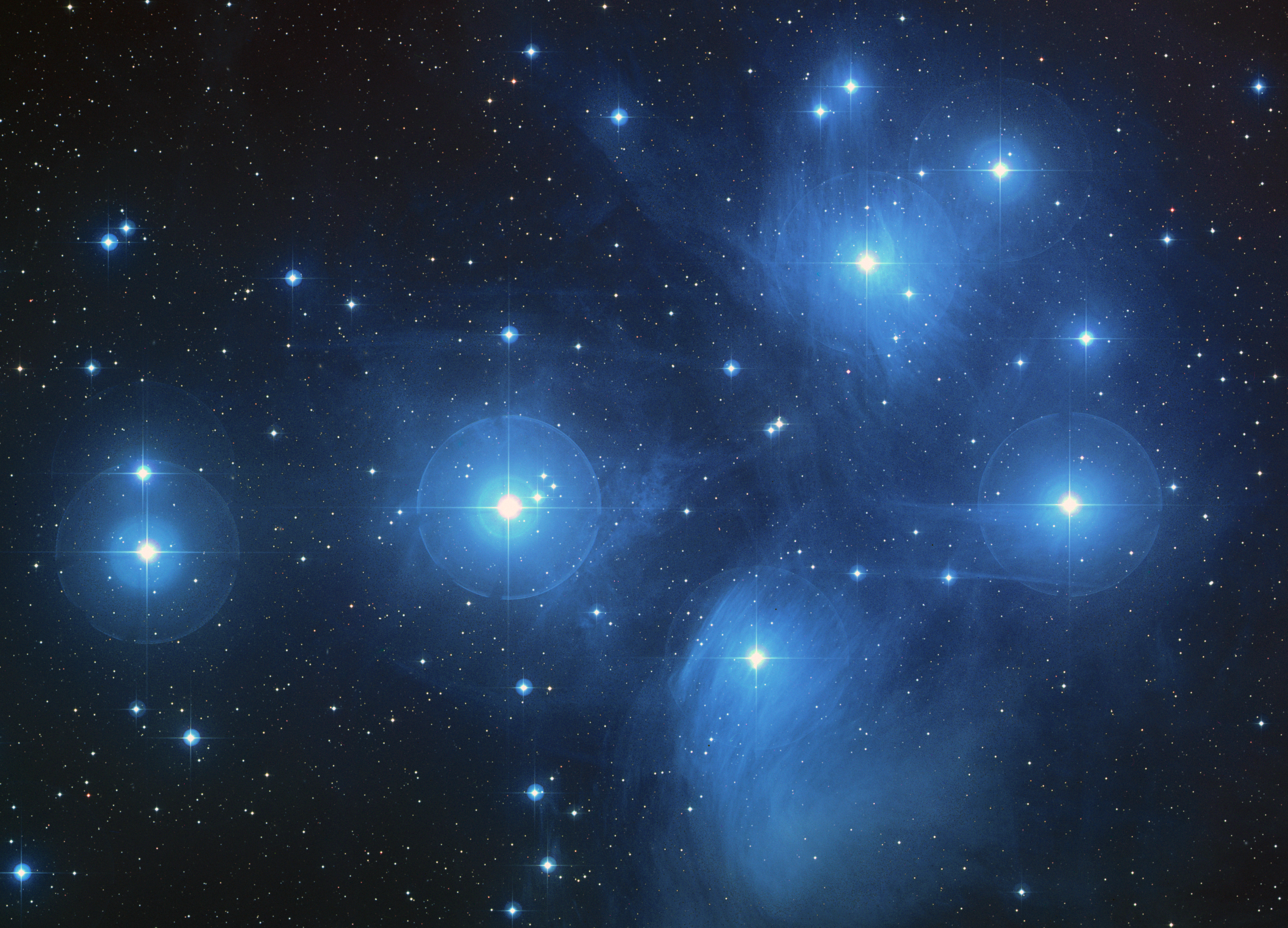
- A color-composite image of the Pleiades from the Digitized Sky Survey

Observation data (J2000 epoch)
- Right ascension: 03^{h} 46^{m} 38.0^{s}
- Declination: +24° 10′ 41″
- Distance: 444 ly on average (136.2±1.2 pc)
- Apparent magnitude (V): 1.6
- Apparent dimensions (V): 2°

Physical characteristics
- Mass: 800 M_{☉}
- Radius: 20.34 light years
- Metallicity: [Fe/H] = 0.042 dex
- Estimated age: 124.53+3.34 −2.70 Myr
- Other designations: Seven Sisters, M45, Cr 42, Mel 22

Associations
- Taurus

The Pleiades (/ˈpliː.ədiːz, ˈpleɪ-, ˈplaɪ-/ PLEE-ə-deez, PLAY-, PLY-), also known as the Seven Sisters and Messier 45 (M45), is an asterism of an open star cluster containing young B-type stars in the northwest of the constellation Taurus. At a distance of about 444 light-years, it is among the star clusters nearest to Earth and is the Messier object nearest to Earth, being the star cluster most obvious to the naked eye in the night sky. It contains over 1,000 stars, with the brightest six or seven being easily visible to the naked eye.

The Pleiades cluster contains the reflection nebulae NGC 1432, an HII region, and NGC 1435, known as the Merope Nebula. Around 2330 BC the Pleiades marked the vernal point. Due to the brightness of its stars, the Pleiades is viewable from most areas on Earth, even in locations with significant light pollution.

The cluster is dominated by hot blue luminous stars that have formed within the last 100 million years. Reflection nebulae around the brightest stars were once thought to be leftover material from their formation, but are now considered likely to be an unrelated dust cloud in the interstellar medium through which the stars are currently passing. This dust cloud is estimated to be moving at a speed of approximately 18 km/s (11 mi/s) relative to the stars in the cluster.

Computer simulations have shown that the Pleiades were probably formed from a compact configuration that once resembled the Orion Nebula. Astronomers estimate that the cluster will survive for approximately another 250 million years, after which the clustering will be lost due to gravitational interactions with the galactic neighborhood.

Together with the open star cluster of the Hyades, the Pleiades form the Golden Gate of the Ecliptic. The Pleiades have been said to "resemble a tiny dipper" and should not be confused with the "Little Dipper", or Ursa Minor.

== Origin of name ==
The name, Pleiades, comes from Ancient Greek: Πλειάδες. It probably derives from plein (πλεῖν 'to sail') because of the cluster's importance in delimiting the sailing season in the Mediterranean Sea: "the season of navigation began with their heliacal rising". In Classical Greek mythology the name was used for seven divine sisters called the Pleiades. In time, the name was said to be derived from that of a mythical mother, Pleione, effectively meaning "daughters of Pleione". In reality, the ancient name of the star cluster related to sailing almost certainly came first in the culture, naming of a relationship to the sister deities followed, and eventually appearing in later myths, to interpret the group name, a mother, Pleione.

== Astronomical role of M45 in antiquity ==
The M45 group played an important role in ancient times for the establishment of many calendars thanks to the combination of two remarkable elements. The first, which is still valid, is its unique and easily identifiable appearance on the celestial vault near the ecliptic. The second, essential for the ancients, is that in the middle of the third millennium BC, this asterism marked the vernal point. (2330 BC with ecliptic latitude about +3.5° according to Stellarium)

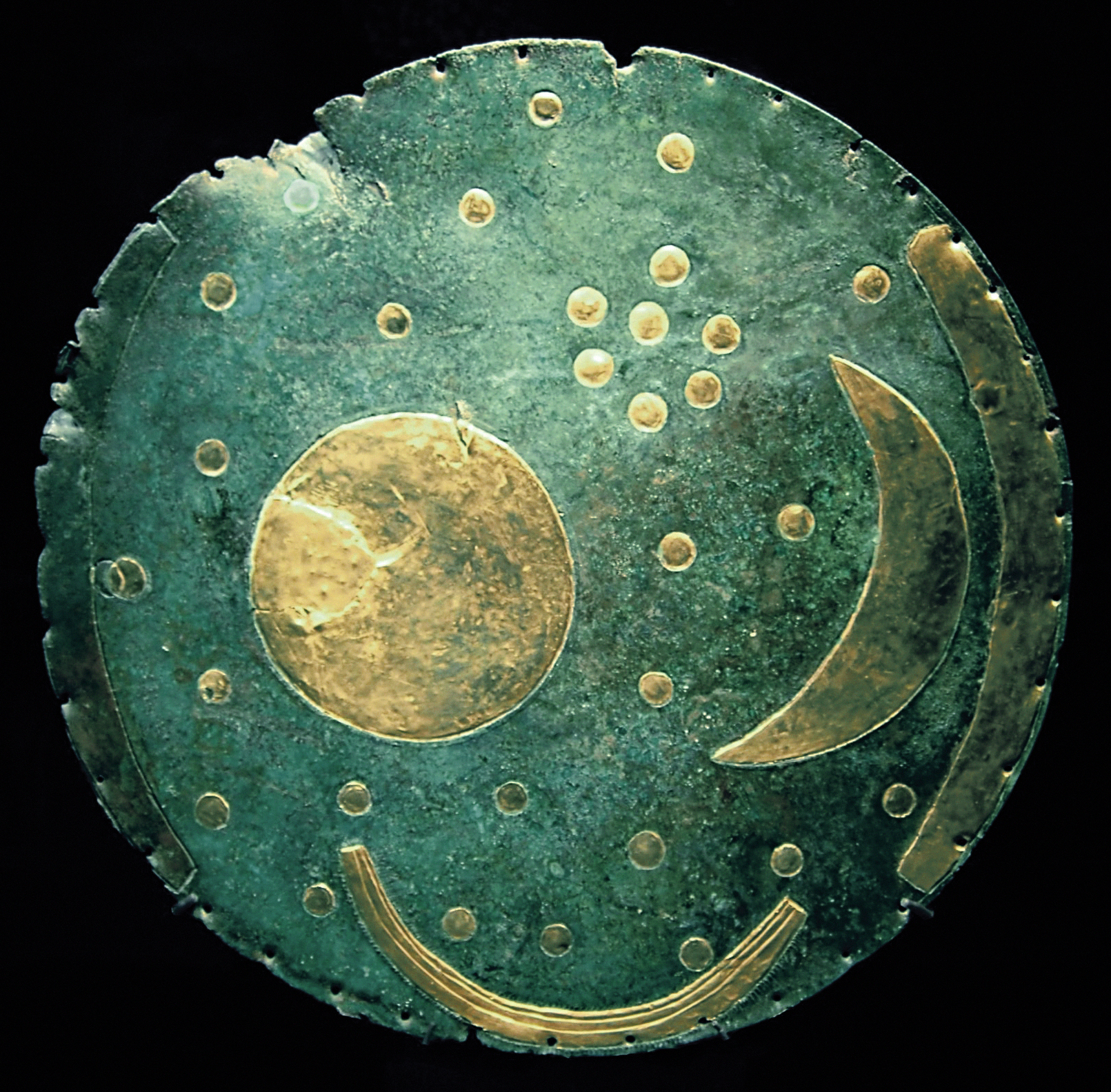
On the Nebra sky disc, dated circa 1600 BC, the cluster of seven dots in the upper right portion of the disk is believed to be the Pleiades.

The importance of this asterism is also evident in northern Europe. The Pleiades cluster is displayed on the Nebra sky disc that was found in Germany and is dated to around 1600 BC. On the disk the cluster is represented in a high position between the Sun and the Moon.

This asterism also marks the beginning of several ancient calendars:

- In ancient India, it constitutes, in the Atharvaveda (अथर्ववेद), compiled around 1200-1000 BC, the first nakṣatra (Sanskrit name for lunar stations), which is called Kṛttikā (कृत्तिका), a revealing name since it literally means 'the Cuttings', i.e. "Those that mark the break of the year". This is so before the classic list lowers this nakṣatra to third place, henceforth giving the first to the star couple β Arietis and γ Arietis, which, notably in Hipparchus, at that time, marks the equinox.
- In Mesopotamia, the MUL.APIN compendium, the first known Mesopotamian astronomy treatise, discovered at Nineveh in the library of Assurbanipal and dating from no later than 627 BC, presents a list of deities [holders of stars] who stand on "the path of the Moon", a list which begins with mul.MUL.
- In Greece, the Pleiádes (Πλειάδες) are a group whose name is probably functional before having a mythological meaning, as André Lebœuffle points out, who has his preference for the explanation by the Indo-European root *pe/ol-/pl- that expresses the idea of 'multiplicity, crowd, assembly'.
- Similarly, the Ancient Arabs begin their old parapegma type calendar, that of the anwāʾ, with M45 under the name of al-Thurayyā (الثريّا). And this before their classic calendar, that of the manāzil al-qamar or 'lunar stations', also begins with the star couple β Arietis and γ Arietis whose name, al-Sharaṭān (الشرطان), is literally "the Two Marks [of entering the equinox]" Although M45 is no longer at the vernal point, the asterism still remains important, both functionally and symbolically. In addition to the changes in the calendars based on the lunar stations among the Indians and the Arabs, consider the case of an ancient Yemeni calendar in which the months are designated according to an astronomical criterion that caused it to be named Calendar of the Pleiades: the month of khams, literally 'five', is that during which the Sun and al-Thurayyā, i.e. the Pleiades, deviate from each other by five movements of the Moon, i.e. five times the path that the Moon travels on average in one day and one night, to use the terminology of Abd al-Rahman al-Sufi.

== Nomenclature and mythology ==
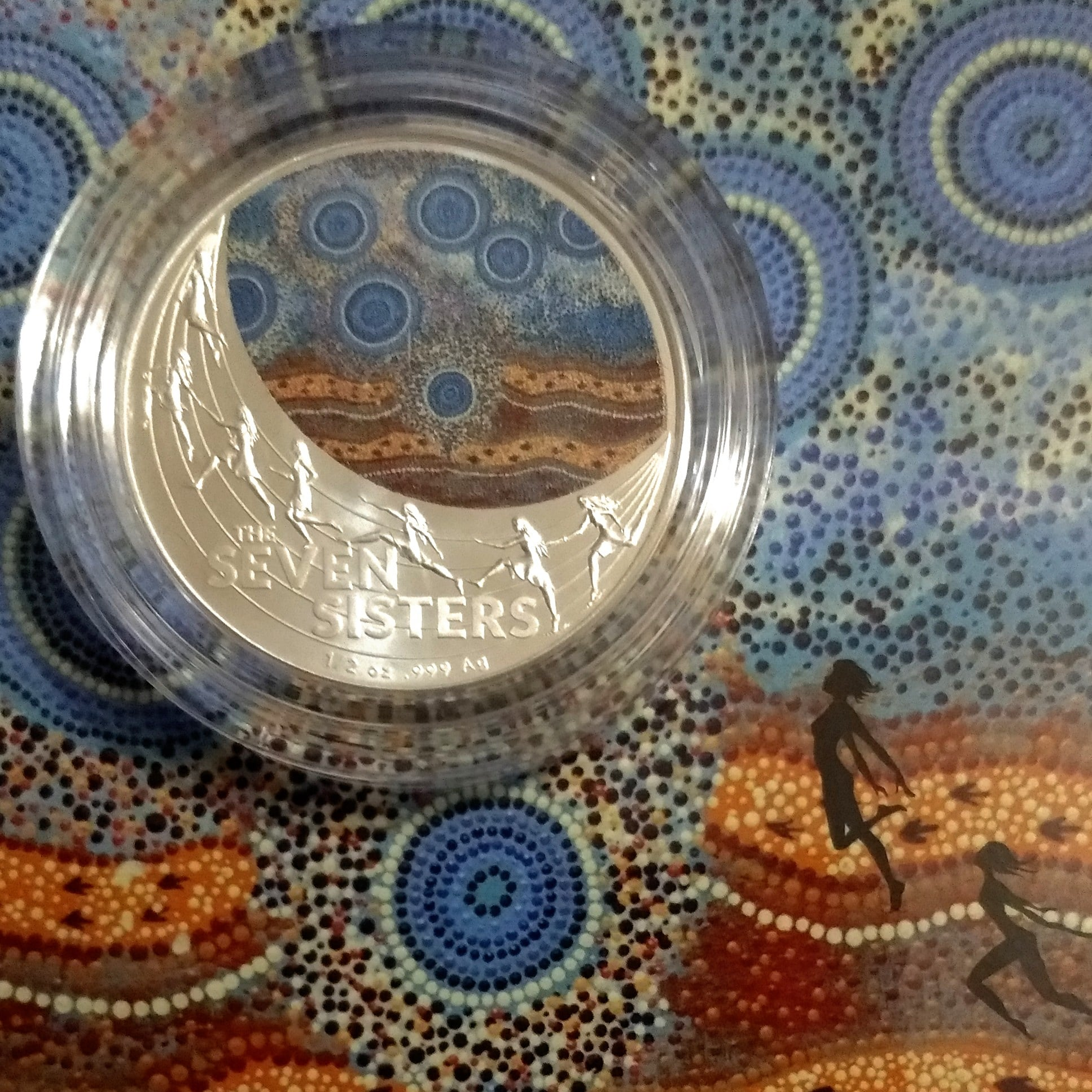
Commemorative silver one dollar coin issued in 2020 by the Royal Australian Mint - on the reverse, the Seven Sisters (Pleiades) are represented as they are portrayed in an ancient story of Australian Indigenous tradition.

The Pleiades are a prominent sight in winter in the Northern Hemisphere, and are easily visible from mid-southern latitudes. They have been known since antiquity to cultures all around the world, including the Celts (Welsh: Tŵr Tewdws, Irish: Streoillín); pre-colonial Filipinos (who called it Mapúlon, Mulo‑pulo or Muró‑púro, among other names), for whom it indicated the beginning of the year; Hawaiians (who call them Makaliʻi), Māori (who call them Matariki); Indigenous Australians (from several traditions); the Achaemenid Empire, whence in Persians (who called them Parvīn پروین or Parvī پروی); the Arabs (who call them al-Thurayyā; الثريا); the Chinese (who called them mǎo; 昴); the Quechua (who call them Qullqa or the storehouse); the Japanese (who call them Subaru; 昴); the Maya; the Aztec; the Sioux; the Kiowa; and the Cherokee.

In Hinduism, the Pleiades are known as Kṛttikā (कृत्तिका) and are scripturally associated with the war deity Kartikeya (कार्त्तिकेय) and are also identified or associated with the Saptamatrika(s) (सप्तमातृका), the Seven Mothers. Hindus celebrate the first day (new moon) of the month of Kartika (month) as Diwali, a festival of abundance and lamps. The Pleiades are also mentioned three times in the Bible, using the constellation's Hebrew name Kimah; כִּימָה.

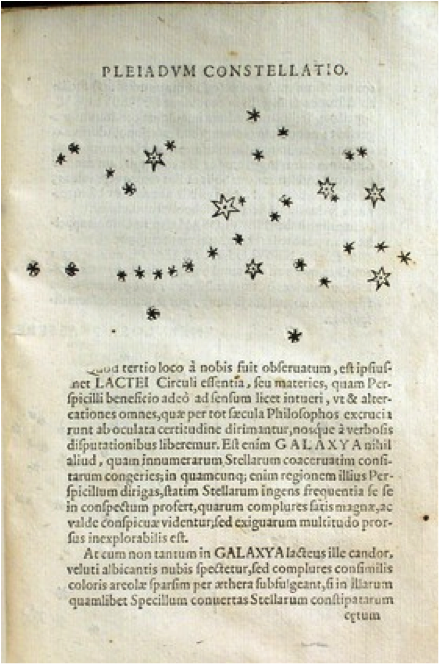
Galileo's drawings of the Pleiades star cluster from Sidereus Nuncius

The earliest known depiction of the Pleiades is likely a Northern German Bronze Age artifact known as the Nebra sky disk, dated to approximately 1600 BC. The Babylonian star catalogues name the Pleiades ^{MUL}MUL (𒀯𒀯), meaning 'stars' (literally 'star star'), and they head the list of stars along the ecliptic, reflecting the fact that they were close to the point of the vernal equinox around the twenty-third century BC. The Ancient Egyptians may have used the names "Followers" and "Ennead" in the prognosis texts of the Calendar of Lucky and Unlucky Days of papyrus Cairo 86637. Some Greek astronomers considered them to be a distinct constellation, and they are mentioned by Hesiod's Works and Days, Homer's Iliad and Odyssey, and the Geoponica. The Pleiades was the most well-known "star" among pre-Islamic Arabs and so often referred to simply as "the Star" (an-Najm; النجم). Some scholars of Islam suggested that the Pleiades are the "star" mentioned in Surah An-Najm ('The Star') in the Quran.

On numerous cylinder seals from the beginning of the first millennium BC, M45 is represented by seven points, while the Seven Gods appear, on low-reliefs of Neo-Assyrian royal palaces, wearing long open robes and large cylindrical headdresses surmounted by short feathers and adorned with three frontal rows of horns and a crown of feathers, while carrying both an ax and a knife, as well as a bow and a quiver.

As noted by scholar Stith Thompson, the constellation was "nearly always imagined" as a group of seven sisters, and their myths explain why there are only six. Some scientists suggest that these may come from observations as far back as 100,000 BC when Pleione was farther from Atlas and hence, more visible as a separate star to the unaided eye.

=== Subaru ===
Logo of Subaru inspired by Pleiades

In Japan, the cluster is mentioned under the name Mutsuraboshi ("six stars") in the eighth-century Kojiki. The cluster is now known in Japan as Subaru, from the intransitive verb subaru, meaning "to cluster together".

The Subaru Telescope, the 8.2-meter (320 in) flagship telescope of the National Astronomical Observatory of Japan, located at the Mauna Kea Observatory on the island of Hawaii, was named after the cluster. It had the largest monolithic primary mirror in the world from its commissioning in 1998 until 2005.

It was also chosen as the brand name of Subaru automobiles to reflect the origins of the firm as the joining of five companies, and is depicted in the firm's six-star logo.

Natsuki Subaru, the protagonist of the Japanese light novel series Re:Zero, was named after the star cluster. In the story, Subaru journeys toward the Pleiades Watchtower, another direct reference to the cluster.

=== Tolkien's legendarium ===
In J. R. R. Tolkien's legendarium, where The Lord of the Rings is set, the Pleiades are referred to as Remmirath, the netted stars, as are several other celestial bodies, such as the constellation Orion as Menelvagor, swordsman of the Sky.

== Observational history ==
Galileo Galilei was the first astronomer to view the Pleiades through a telescope. He thereby discovered that the cluster contains many stars too dim to be seen with the naked eye. He published his observations, including a sketch of the Pleiades showing 36 stars, in his treatise Sidereus Nuncius in March 1610.

The Pleiades have long been known to be a physically related group of stars rather than any chance alignment. John Michell calculated in 1767 that the probability of a chance alignment of so many bright stars was only 1 in 500,000, and so surmised that the Pleiades and many other clusters must consist of physically related stars. When studies were first made of the proper motions of the stars, it was found that they are all moving in the same direction across the sky, at the same rate, further demonstrating that they were related.

Charles Messier measured the position of the cluster and included it as "M45" in his catalogue of comet-like objects, published in 1771. Along with the Orion Nebula and the Praesepe cluster, Messier's inclusion of the Pleiades has been noted as curious, as most of Messier's objects were much fainter and more easily confused with comets—something that seems scarcely possible for the Pleiades. One possibility is that Messier simply wanted to have a larger catalogue than his scientific rival Lacaille, whose 1755 catalogue contained 42 objects, and so he added some bright, well-known objects to boost the number on his list.

Edme-Sébastien Jeaurat then drew in 1782 a map of 64 stars of the Pleiades from his observations in 1779, which he published in 1786.

== Distance ==
Location of Pleiades (circled) in the night sky

The distance to the Pleiades can be used as a key first step to calibrate the cosmic distance ladder. As the cluster is relatively close to the Earth, the distance should be relatively easy to measure and has been estimated by many methods. Accurate knowledge of the distance allows astronomers to plot a Hertzsprung–Russell diagram for the cluster, which, when compared with those plotted for clusters whose distance is not known, allows their distances to be estimated. Other methods may then extend the distance scale from open clusters to galaxies and clusters of galaxies, and a cosmic distance ladder may be constructed. Ultimately astronomers' understanding of the age and future evolution of the universe is influenced by their knowledge of the distance to the Pleiades. Yet some authors argue that the controversy over the distance to the Pleiades discussed below is a red herring, since the cosmic distance ladder can (presently) rely on a suite of other nearby clusters where consensus exists regarding the distances as established by the Hipparcos satellite and independent means (e.g., the Hyades, the Coma Berenices cluster, etc.).

Animation of proper motion in 400,000 years—cross-eyed viewing (click for viewing guide)

Measurements of the distance have elicited much controversy. Results prior to the launch of the Hipparcos satellite generally found that the Pleiades were approximately 135 parsecs (pc) away from Earth. Data from Hipparcos yielded a surprising result, namely a distance of only 118 pc, by measuring the parallax of stars in the cluster—a technique that should yield the most direct and accurate results. Later work consistently argued that the Hipparcos distance measurement for the Pleiades was erroneous: In particular, distances derived to the cluster via the Hubble Space Telescope and infrared color–magnitude diagram fitting (so-called "spectroscopic parallax") favor a distance between 135 and 140 pc; a dynamical distance from optical interferometric observations of the inner pair of stars within Atlas (a bright triple star in the Pleiades) favors a distance of 133 to 137 pc. However, the author of the 2007–2009 catalog of revised Hipparcos parallaxes reasserted that the distance to the Pleiades is ~120 pc and challenged the dissenting evidence. In 2012, Francis and Anderson proposed that a systematic effect on Hipparcos parallax errors for stars in clusters would bias calculation using the weighted mean; they gave a Hipparcos parallax distance of 126 pc and photometric distance of 132 pc based on stars in the AB Doradus, Tucana-Horologium and Beta Pictoris moving groups, which are all similar in age and composition to the Pleiades. Those authors note that the difference between these results may be attributed to random error. More recent results using very-long-baseline interferometry (VLBI) (August 2014), and preliminary solutions using Gaia Data Release 1 (September 2016) and Gaia Data Release 2 (August 2018), determine distances of 136.2±1.2 pc, 134±6 pc and 136.2±5.0 pc, respectively. The Gaia Data Release 1 team were cautious about their result, and the VLBI authors assert "that the Hipparcos-measured distance to the Pleiades cluster is in error".

The most recent distance estimate of the distance to the Pleiades based on the Gaia Data Release 3 is 135.74±0.10 pc.

Selected distance estimates to the Pleiades
Year	Distance (pc)	Notes
1999	118.3+3.6 −3.4	Hipparcos
2004	134.6±3.1	Hubble Fine Guidance Sensor
2009	120.2±1.9	Revised Hipparcos
2011	138±6	NIR color-magnitude diagram
2014	136.2±1.2	Very-long-baseline interferometry
2016	134±6	Gaia Data Release 1
2018	136.2±5.0	Gaia Data Release 2
2023	135.74±0.10	Gaia Data Release 3

== Composition ==
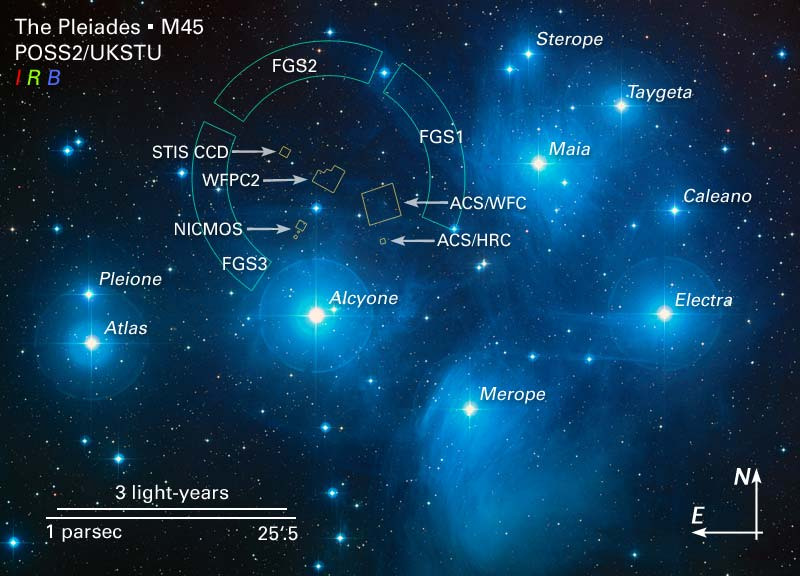
A map of the Pleiades

The cluster core radius is approximately 8 light-years and tidal radius is approximately 43 light-years. The cluster contains more than 1,000 statistically confirmed members, not counting the number that would be added if all binary stars could be resolved. Its light is dominated by young, hot blue stars, up to 14 of which may be seen with the naked eye, depending on local observing conditions and visual acuity of the observer. The brightest stars form a shape somewhat similar to that of Ursa Major and Ursa Minor. The total mass contained in the cluster is estimated to be approximately 800 solar masses and the mass is dominated by fainter and redder stars. An estimate of the frequency of binary stars in the Pleiades is approximately 57%.

The cluster contains many brown dwarfs, such as Teide 1. These are objects with less than approximately 8% of the Sun's mass, insufficient for the nuclear fusion of hydrogen to start in their cores and become proper stars. They may constitute up to 25% of the total population of the cluster, although they contribute less than 2% of the total mass. Astronomers have made great efforts to find and analyze brown dwarfs in the Pleiades and other young clusters, because they are still relatively bright and observable, while brown dwarfs in older clusters have faded and are much more difficult to study.

== Members ==
The brightest stars of the cluster are named after the Seven Sisters in Greek mythology: Asterope, Merope, Electra, Maia, Taygeta, Celaeno, and Alcyone; as well as their parents, Pleione and Atlas. As daughters of Atlas, the Hyades were sisters of the Pleiades. The stars were not individually named by the ancient Greeks, but only in post-telescopic times once they could be clearly distinguished. The first recorded use of their current names was by Giovanni Battista Riccioli in his 1665 book Astronomia Reformata, (Note: Riccioli had previously used different names for the Pleiades in his Almagestum Novum of 1651, which referred to the brightest star as Maia after the eldest of the Pleiades sisters (it is now named Alcyone).) which credited Vicente Mut Armengol for naming the seven main stars and Michael van Langren for naming Atlas and Pleione. These names did not become widely used until the 19th century, after which they became established and are now officially recognized by the IAU.

The following table gives details of the brightest stars in the cluster:

Pleiades bright stars
Name (Designation)	English pronunciation	Apparent magnitude	Stellar classification	Distance (ly)
Alcyone (Eta Tauri)	/ælˈsaɪəni/	2.86	B7IIIe	409±50
Atlas (27 Tauri)	/ˈætləs/	3.62	B8III	387±26
Electra (17 Tauri)	/iˈlɛktrə/	3.70	B6IIIe	375±23
Maia (20 Tauri)	/ˈmaɪə/	3.86	B7III	344±25
Merope (23 Tauri)	/ˈmɛrəpi/	4.17	B6IVev	344±16
Taygeta (19 Tauri)	/teɪˈɪdʒɛtə/	4.29	B6IV	364±16
Pleione (28 Tauri)	/ˈpliːjɒni/	5.09 (var.)	B8IVpe	422±11
Celaeno (16 Tauri)	/sɛˈliːnoʊ/	5.44	B7IV	434±10
HD 23753	—	5.44	B9Vn	420±10
Asterope (21 Tauri)	/ˈstɛroʊpi/	5.64	B8Ve	431±8
18 Tauri	—	5.66	B8V	444±7
HD 23923	—	6.16	B8V	435±4
22 Tauri	—	6.41	B9V	444±6
HD 23712	—	6.53	K5	450
HD 23853	—	6.59	B9.5V	459±4
HD 23410	—	6.88	A0V	443±5

== Age and future evolution ==
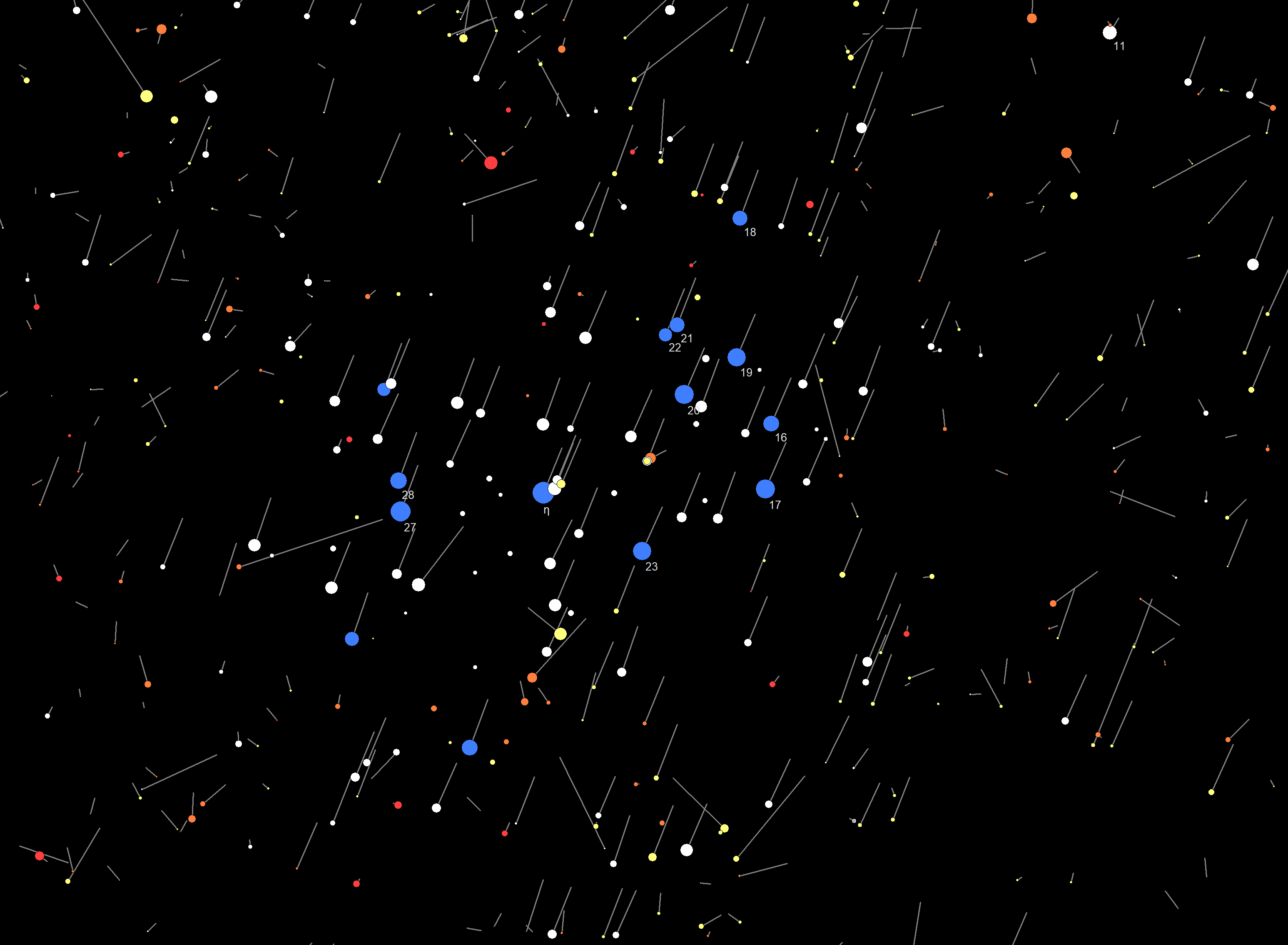
Stars of Pleiades with color and 10,000-year backward proper motion shown

Ages for star clusters may be estimated by comparing the Hertzsprung–Russell diagram for the cluster with theoretical models of stellar evolution. Using this technique, ages for the Pleiades of between 75 and 150 million years have been estimated. The wide spread in estimated ages is a result of uncertainties in stellar evolution models, which include factors such as convective overshoot, in which a convective zone within a star penetrates an otherwise non-convective zone, resulting in higher apparent ages.

Another way of estimating the age of the cluster is by looking at the lowest-mass objects. In normal main-sequence stars, lithium is rapidly destroyed in nuclear fusion reactions. Brown dwarfs can retain their lithium, however. Due to lithium's very low ignition temperature of 2.5 million K, the highest-mass brown dwarfs will burn it eventually, and so determining the highest mass of brown dwarfs still containing lithium in the cluster may give an idea of its age. Applying this technique to the Pleiades gives an age of about 115 million years.

The cluster is slowly moving in the direction of the feet of what is currently the constellation of Orion. Like most open clusters, the Pleiades will not stay gravitationally bound forever. Some component stars will be ejected after close encounters with other stars; others will be stripped by tidal gravitational fields. Calculations suggest that the cluster will take approximately 250 million years to disperse, because of gravitational interactions with giant molecular clouds and the spiral arms of our galaxy hastening its demise.

== Reflection nebulosity ==
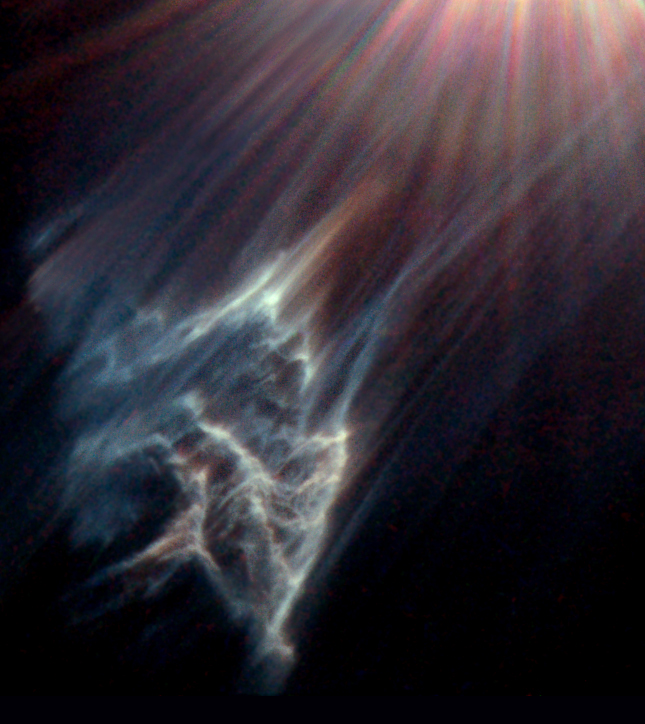
Hubble Space Telescope image of reflection nebulosity near Merope (IC 349)

With larger amateur telescopes, the nebulosity around some of the stars may be easily seen, especially when long-exposure photographs are taken. Under ideal observing conditions, some hint of nebulosity around the cluster may be seen even with small telescopes or average binoculars. It is a reflection nebula, caused by dust reflecting the blue light of the hot, young stars.

It was formerly thought that the dust was left over from the formation of the cluster, but at the age of approximately 100 million years generally accepted for the cluster, almost all the dust originally present would have been dispersed by radiation pressure. Instead, it seems that the cluster is simply passing through a particularly dusty region of the interstellar medium.

Studies show that the dust responsible for the nebulosity is not uniformly distributed, but is concentrated mainly in two layers along the line of sight to the cluster. These layers may have been formed by deceleration due to radiation pressure as the dust has moved toward the stars.

== Possible planets ==
Analyzing deep-infrared images obtained by the Spitzer Space Telescope and Gemini North telescope, astronomers discovered that one of the stars in the cluster, HD 23514, which has a mass and luminosity a bit greater than that of the Sun, is surrounded by an extraordinary number of hot dust particles. This could be evidence for planet formation around HD 23514.

== Gallery ==
A 3-D model of the Pleiades open cluster from the Galaxy Map app (iOS/Android)

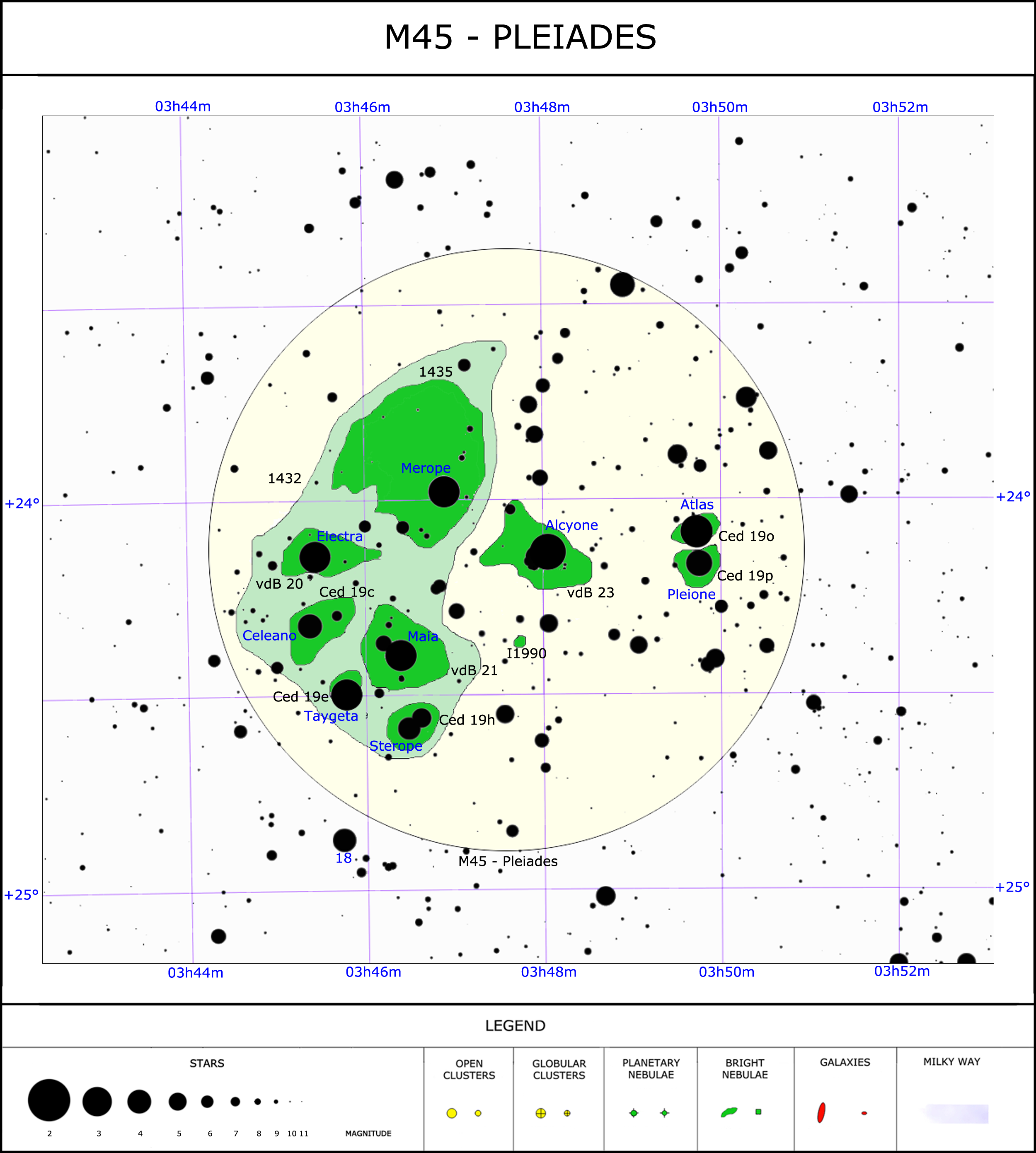
A star chart of the Pleiades and their nebulae

== See also ==
- Australian Aboriginal astronomy § Seven Sisters
- The Seven Sages
- Stozhary
- Matrikas
- Bibliothèque de la Pléiade
