= Atlas (star) =

Binary star system in the constellation Taurus

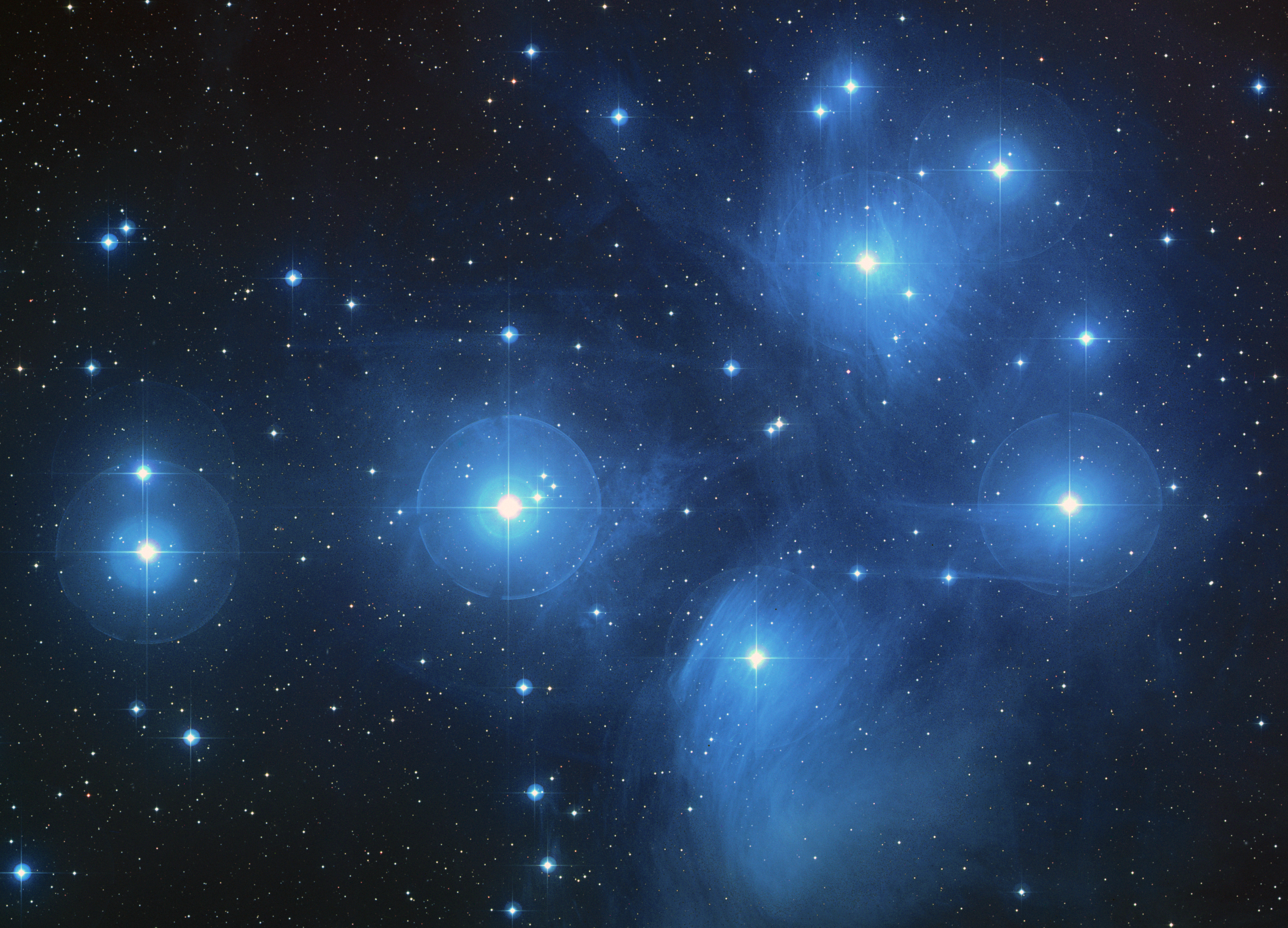
- Atlas in the Pleiades cluster (circled)

Observation data Epoch J2000 Equinox ICRS
- Constellation: Taurus
- Right ascension: 03^{h} 49^{m} 09.74306^{s}
- Declination: +24° 03′ 12.3017″
- Apparent magnitude (V): 3.63 (3.84 / 5.46)

Characteristics
- Evolutionary stage: main sequence + main sequence
- Spectral type: B8III
- U−B color index: −0.36
- B−V color index: −0.08
- Variable type: SPB

Astrometry
Radial velocity (R_{v})	8.5±2 km/s
Proper motion (μ)	RA: +19.079 mas/yr Dec.: −46.193 mas/yr
Parallax (π)	8.1184±0.4791 mas
Distance	444.2 ± 4.6 ly (136.2±1.4 pc)
Absolute magnitude (M_{V})	−1.82

Orbit
Primary	Aa1
Name	Aa2
Period (P)	290.9919±0.0028 d
Semi-major axis (a)	1.768±0.018 au
Eccentricity (e)	0.23565±0.00011
Inclination (i)	107.863±0.032°
Longitude of the node (Ω)	334.202±0.025°
Periastron epoch (T)	BJD 2450585.988±0.096
Argument of periastron (ω) (secondary)	335.697±0.082°
Semi-amplitude (K_{1}) (primary)	27.09±0.40 km/s
Semi-amplitude (K_{2}) (secondary)	37.63±0.53 km/s

Details

Aa1
Mass	5.04±0.17 M_{☉}
Radius	7.81±0.18 (equatorial); 6.48±0.50 (polar) R_{☉}
Luminosity	1,260 L_{☉}
Surface gravity (log g)	3.38±0.07 cgs
Temperature	12,525±200 K
Rotational velocity (v sin i)	217±9 km/s

Aa2
Mass	3.64±0.12 M_{☉}
Radius	3.2±0.3 R_{☉}
Luminosity	250 L_{☉}
Surface gravity (log g)	4.20±0.15 cgs
Temperature	12,835±450 K
Rotational velocity (v sin i)	47±7 km/s

Other designations
- Atlas, 27 Tau, BD+23°557, FK5 142, HD 23850, HIP 17847, HR 1178, SAO 76228

Database references
SIMBAD	data

Atlas /ˈætləs/, designation 27 Tauri, is a binary star system in the constellation of Taurus. It is a member of the Pleiades, an open star cluster (M45). It is 444 light-years (136 parsecs) away, and is 3.92 degrees north of the ecliptic.

== Nomenclature ==
27 Tauri is the star's Flamsteed designation. It has the proper name Atlas; Atlas was a Titan and the father of the Pleiades sisters in Greek mythology.

In 2016 the International Astronomical Union organized a Working Group on Star Names (WGSN) to catalogue and standardize proper names for stars. The WGSN approved the name Atlas for this star on 21 August 2016 and it is now so entered in the IAU Catalog of Star Names.

== Properties ==
Atlas is a binary star system, orbiting in under a year. An outer star, component Ab (sometimes component B, such as in CCDM and SIMBAD), has been claimed to be resolved at a distance of 0.784″ from the unresolved spectroscopic binary, with an apparent magnitude of 6.8, three magnitudes fainter than the combined magnitude of the closer pair. It would have an estimated mass of twice that of the Sun. However, no new detections have been reported since 1929, even though more recent instruments would be able to identify it. In the WDS catalog, there are 8 other stars, ranging from B-I, which have been classed as companions of Atlas.

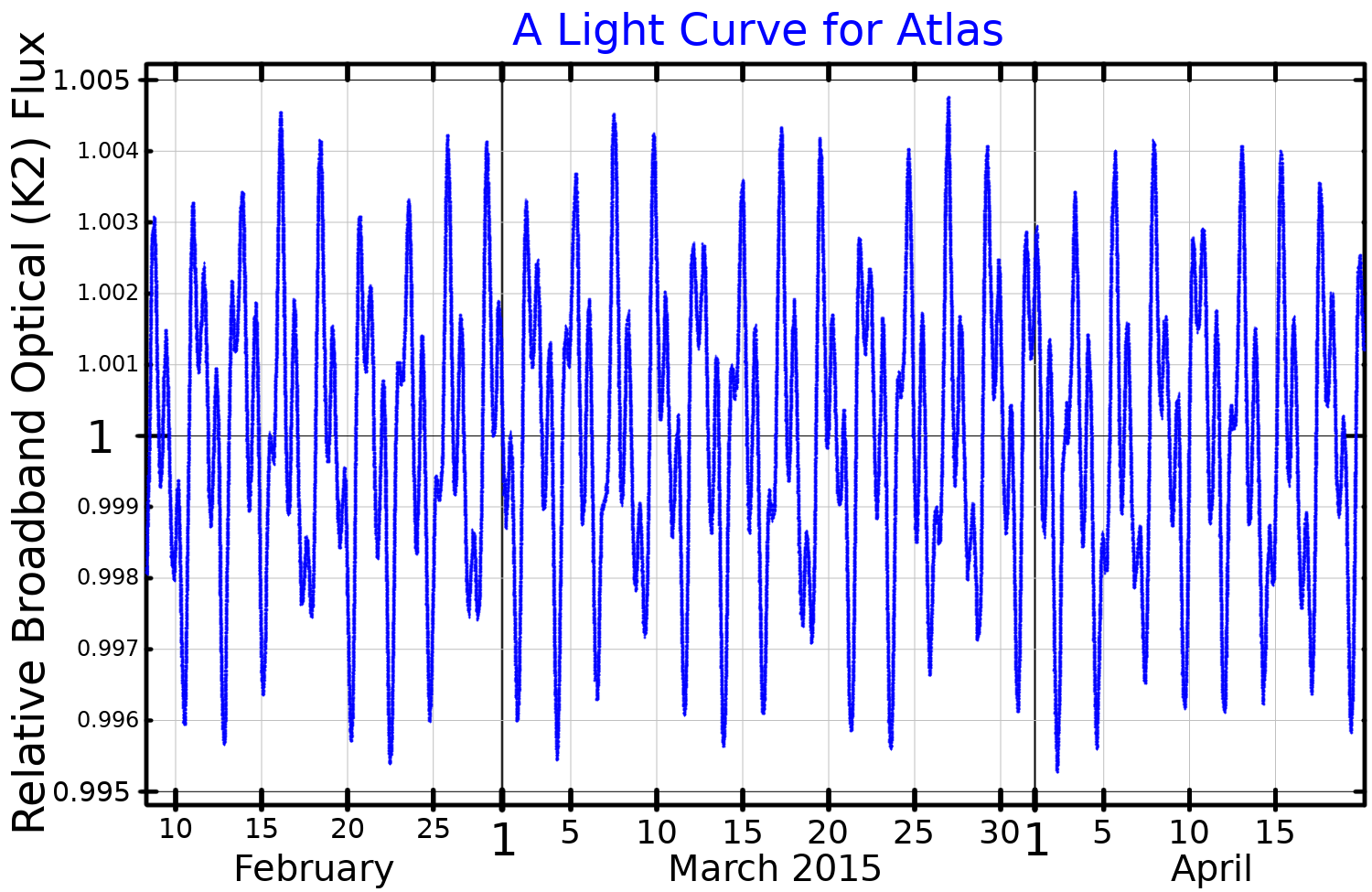
A light curve for Atlas, adapted from White et al. (2017)

The pair have a well-defined orbit with a period of 291 days, a semi-major axis of 13 mas, and an eccentricity of 0.24. At an inclination of 108° to the plane of the sky, it does not show eclipses. Although the two stars cannot be resolved, the primary, component Aa1, is calculated to be 1.6 magnitudes brighter than the secondary, component Aa2. The primary star is rapidly rotating and is significantly oblate; the ratio of the polar to equatorial radius is 0.83. It rotates at an inclination of either 64°±20° or 116°±20°, the latter consistent with its rotation being aligned with the orbit.

Low amplitude variability of the brightness of Atlas was tentatively detected in observations by STEREO and clearly detected by Kepler/K2. The light curve varies with several periods, the most prominent being 2.427, 0.7457 and 1.214 days.
