= Be star =

B-type star with emission lines

Depiction of Achernar, the brightest Be star

Be stars are a heterogeneous set of stars with B spectral types and emission lines. A narrower definition, sometimes referred to as classical Be stars, is a non-supergiant B star whose spectrum has, or had at some time, one or more Balmer emission lines.

== Definition and classification ==
Many stars have B-type spectra and show hydrogen emission lines, including many supergiants, Herbig Ae/Be stars, mass-transferring binary systems, and B[e] stars. It is preferred to restrict usage of the term Be star to non-supergiant stars showing one or more Balmer series lines in emission. These are sometimes referred to as classical Be stars. The emission lines may be present only at certain times.

Although the Be type spectrum is most strongly produced in class B stars, it is also detected in O and A shell stars, and these are sometimes included under the "Be star" banner. Be stars are primarily considered to be main sequence stars, but a number of subgiants and giant stars are also included.

== Discovery ==
The first star recognized as a Be star was Gamma Cassiopeiae, observed 1866 by Angelo Secchi, the first star ever observed with emission lines. Many other bright stars were found to show similar spectra, although many of these are no longer considered to be classical Be stars. The brightest is Achernar, although it was not recognised as a Be star until 1976.

== Model ==
With the understanding of the processes of emission line formation in the early 20th century it became clear that these lines in Be stars must come from circumstellar material ejected from the star helped by the rapid rotation of the star. All the observational characteristics of Be stars can now be explained with a gaseous disk that is formed of material ejected from the star. The infrared excess and the polarization result from the scattering of stellar light in the disk, while the line emission is formed by re-processing stellar ultraviolet light in the gaseous disc.

== Shell stars ==
Some Be stars exhibit spectral features that are interpreted as a detached "shell" of gas surrounding the star, or more accurately a disc or ring. These shell features are thought to be caused when the disc of gas that is present around many Be stars is aligned edge on to us so that it creates very narrow absorption lines in the spectrum.

== Variability ==
Be stars are often visually and spectroscopically variable. Be stars can be classified as Gamma Cassiopeiae variables when a transient or variable disk is observed. Be stars that show variability without clear indication of the mechanism are listed simply as BE in the General Catalogue of Variable Stars. Some of these are thought to be pulsating stars and are sometimes called Lambda Eridani variables.
