= Corythus =

Mythological Greek characters

Corythus is the name of six mortal men in Greek mythology.

- Corythus, son of Marmarus, and one of the court of Cepheus. He wounded Pelates during the battle at the wedding feast of Perseus and Andromeda.
- Corythus, an Italian king and father, in some sources, of Iasion and Dardanus by Electra.
- Corythus, one of the Lapiths. Only a youth, he was killed nonetheless by Rhoetus, one of the Centaurs.
- Corythus, an Iberian, beloved of Heracles. Was said to have been the first to devise a helmet (Greek korys, gen. korythos), which took its name from him.
- Corythus, one of the Doliones. He was killed by Tydeus.
- Corythus, a king who raised Telephus, son of Heracles and Auge, as his own son.
- Corythus, son of Paris and the nymph Oenone. When he grew up, his mother sent him to cause trouble at Troy. Not recognizing his son, Paris killed him.
- Corythus, son of Paris and Helen. He died along with his two brothers when a roof collapsed in Troy.
