= Dardanus (mythological king) =

In Greek mythology, Dardanus (/ˈdɑːrdənəs/; Greek: Δάρδανος, Dardanos) was a Scythian king, who was the father of Idaea, the second wife of Phineus, the king of Salmydessus in Thrace. After Idaea falsely accused Phineus' sons by his first wife, she was sent back to Dardanus, where he condemned her to death.

The father of Phineus's wife Idaea, has sometimes been confused with, or considered to be the same as the Dardanus who was the son of Zeus and Electra, and ancestor of the Trojans.
