= Idaea =

Idaea or Idaia (Ancient Greek: Ἰδαία, lit. 'she who comes from Ida or she who lives on Ida') referring to either the Cretan Mount Ida, or the Phrygian Mount Ida in the Troad, is the name of several figures in Greek mythology:

- Idaea, a nymph, who was the mother, by the river-god Scamander, of King Teucer.
- Idaea, the daughter of the Scythian king Dardanus, and wife of Phineus, who falsely accused her stepsons, leading to their imprisonment and torture.
- Idaea one of several epithets of Cybele, the great mother goddess of Anatolia, associated with Phrygian Mount Ida.
- Idaea, a nymph who was said to be the mother, by the shepherd Theodorus, of Erythraean Sibyl Herophile, and gave birth to her in a grotto at Erythrae.
- Idaea, the mother of the Kuretes (Κουρῆτες) by an earlier Zeus who was, according to a tradition attributed by Diodorus Siculus to the Phrygians, the brother of Uranus and king of Crete, rather than the Olympian Zeus.
- Idaea, a nymph said to be the mother, by Zeus, of Cres who was said to be the eponym of Crete.
- Idaea or Ida, a daughter of Minos who was the mother of Asterion by Zeus. She might be the same with the above character.
