= Pandion =

Pandion /pænˈdaɪɒn/ may refer to:

== In Greek mythology ==
- Pandion (mythology) for mythological characters named Pandion.
  - Pandion I, a legendary king of Athens, father of the sisters Procne and Philomela.
  - Pandion II, a legendary king of Athens, father of the brothers Aegeus, Pallas, Nisos and Lycus.
  - Pandion (hero), the eponymous hero of the Attic tribe Pandionis, usually assumed to be one of the legendary Athenian kings Pandion I or Pandion II.
  - Pandion son of Phineus in Greek mythology
  - Pandion, a son of Aegyptus, husband and victim of Callidice, daughter of Danaus

== Other uses ==
- King Pandion, a member of the Pandya Dynasty (c. 50 BC – 50 CE)
- Pandion (bird), a genus of birds of prey with a single member, the osprey (Pandion haliaetus), or, depending on the authority, two species
  - Western osprey, Pandion haliaetus
  - Eastern osprey, Pandion cristatus
- Pandion, the highest status level in the EuroBonus frequent flyer program
- Alfa Romeo Pandion, a concept car by Bertone shown at the 2010 Geneva Motor Show
