= Zakynthos (disambiguation) =

Zakynthos may refer to:

- Zakynthos, a Greek island in the Ionian Sea
- Zakynthos (city), the main town on the island Zakynthos
- Zakynthos International Airport, on the island Zakynthos
- Zakynthos (person), a figure in Greek mythology, first settler of the island Zakynthos
