= Corybas (mythology) =

Son of Iasion and Cybele in Greek mythology

- Abode: Samothrace, later Phrygia

Genealogy
- Parents: (1) Iasion and Cybele
- Siblings: (1) Plutus and Philomelus (half-brothers)
- Consort: Thebe
- Children: Ida

In Greek mythology, Corybas (Ancient Greek: Κορύβας, romanized: Korúbas) is the son of Iasion and the goddess Cybele, who gave his name to the Corybantes (Koribantes), or dancing priests of Phrygia. The Korybantes were associated with Orpheus, another son of Apollo and a Mousa, founder of the closely related Orphic Mysteries.

== Mythology ==
According to Diodorus Siculus:

This wedding of Cadmus and Harmonia was the first, we are told, for which the gods provided the marriage-feast, and Demeter, becoming enamoured of Iasion, presented him with the fruit of the corn, Hermes gave a lyre (lyra), Athena the renowned necklace and a robe and a flute (auloi), and Electra the sacred rites of the Great Mother of the Gods, as she is called, together with cymbals (kymbala) and kettledrums (tympana) and the instruments of her ritual; and Apollo played upon the lyre (kitharisai) and the Muses upon their flutes (aulesai), and the rest of the gods spoke them fair and gave the pair their aid in the celebration of the wedding. After this Cadmus, they say, in accordance with the oracle he had received, founded Thebes in Boeotia, while Iasion married Cybele and beget Corybas. And after Iasion had been removed into the circle of the gods, Dardanus and Cybelê and Corybas conveyed to Asia the sacred rites of the Mother of the Gods and removed with them to Phrygia. Thereupon Cybelê, joining herself to the first Olympus, begat Alcê and called the goddess Cybelê after herself; and Corybas gave the name of Corybantes to all who, in celebrating the rites of his mother, acted like men possessed, and married Thebe, the daughter of Cilix. In like manner he also transferred the flute (auloi) from Samothrace to Phrygia and to Lyrnessus the lyre (lyra) which Hermes gave and which at a later time Achilles took for himself when he sacked that city.

Also, according to Diodorus Siculus, Corybas was the father of Ida who married Lycastus, the a king of Crete, and son of Minos the first king of Crete, and by him bore the "second" king Minos of Crete.

== See also ==
- Satrapes
