= Polydorus =

Disambiguation link for various Greek mythological figures

In Greek mythology, Polydorus or Polydoros (/ˌpɒlɪˈdɔːrəs/; Ancient Greek: Πολύδωρος, romanized: Polýdōros, lit. 'many-gift[ed]') referred to several different people.

- Polydorus, son of Phineus and Cleopatra, and brother of Polydector (Polydectus). These two sons by his first wife were blinded by Phineus because of the instigation of their stepmother, Idaea, who accused them of corrupting her virtue.
- Prince Polydorus, son of the King Cadmus and goddess Harmonia, fathered Labdacus by his wife Nycteis.
- Polydorus, an Argive, son of Hippomedon and Euanippe, daughter of Elatus. Pausanias lists him as one of the Epigoni, who attacked Thebes in retaliation for the deaths of their fathers, the Seven against Thebes, who died attempting the same thing.
- Prince Polydorus, a Trojan, was King Priam's youngest son.
- Polydorus, a Ceteian warrior who participated in the Trojan War. During the siege of Troy, he was killed by Odysseus using his sword along with Aenus, another Ceteian. (Ceteius is called a stream in Asia Minor).
- Polydorus (son of Astyanax)
- Polydorus, one of the suitors of Penelope who came from Zacynthus along with other 43 wooers. He, with the other suitors, was shot dead by Odysseus with the assistance of Eumaeus, Philoetius, and Telemachus.

In history, Polydorus was:

- Polydorus of Sparta (reigned from c. 741 to c. 665 BC)
- Polydorus, tyrant of Pherae, ruled briefly in 370 BC

In art, Polydorus was:

- One of the three Rhodian sculptors who created the sculpture Laocoön and His Sons and signed the Sperlonga sculptures

== See also ==
- Polydora
