= Aenus =

Aenus may refer to:

- Aenus (Thrace), an ancient city, now Enez, Turkey
- Aenus (mythology), a Ceteian soldier slain in the siege of Troy
- Inn (river) (Latin: Aenus), a river in Switzerland, Austria and Germany

== See also ==
- Mount Ainos, on the Ionian island of Cephalonia, Greece
