= Atymnius =

Set of mythological Greek characters

In Greek mythology, Atymnius (Ancient Greek: Ἀτύμνιος derived from atos and hymnos which means "insatiate of heroic praise") may refer to:

- Atymnius, a beautiful boy, who was beloved by Sarpedon and Minos both, over whom they quarrelled. He was the son of Cassiopeia either by the god Zeus or by her mortal husband Phoenix. Atymnius seems to have been worshipped at Gortyn in Crete together with Europa.
- Atymnius, a Trojan warrior, son of Emathion and Pegasis. He was killed by Odysseus in the last year of the Trojan War.
- Atymnius, father of Mydon, charioteer of Pylaemenes.
- Atymnius, a companion of Sarpedon, from Lycia. He was the son of Amisodarus (who had reared Chimera) and the brother of Maris. In the Trojan War Atymnius was killed by Antilochus. In the same battle Maris, attempting to revenge his brother's death, was slain by Thrasymedes.
