= Temple of Dionysus Lysios =

The Temple of Dionysus Lysios was a sanctuary in Thebes, Greece dedicated to Dionysus. It was one of the main cult centers of Dionysus.

Thebes had an important role in the cult of Dionysus as the place of several important events of the divine myths of the god. It was believed to be the place of the immolation of Semele, and contained what was said to be her tomb. The temple was situated near the theater in the city of Thebes. It was dedicated to the god under the name of Dionysus Lysios.

Pausanias described the sanctuary in the 1st century:

Near the Proitidian gate [of Thebes, Boiotia] is built a theater, and quite close to the theater is a temple of Dionysos surnamed Lysios (Deliverer). For when some Theban prisoners in the hands of Thracians had reached Haliartia on their march, they were delivered by the god, who gave up the sleeping Thracians to be put to death. One of the two images here the Thebans say is Semele. Once in each year, they say, they open the sanctuary on stated days. There are also ruins of the house of Lykos, and the tomb of Semele.

Aside from the Temple of Dionysus Lysios, Pausanias also writes:

... there is also a story that along with the thunderbolt hurled at the bridal chamber of Semele there fell a log from heaven. They say that [King] Polydoros adorned this log with bronze and called it Dionysos Kadmos. Near is an image of Dionysos; Onasimedes made it of solid bronze. The altar was built by the sons of Praxiteles.

This was however the Shrine to Dionysus Kadmeios, which was different shrine in Thebes, separate from that of Dionysus Lysios. If still in use by the 4th century, the temple would have been closed during the persecution of pagans in the late Roman Empire, when the Christian Emperors issued edicts prohibiting non-Christian worship.

== See also ==
- List of Ancient Greek temples
- Architecture of Ancient Greece
