= Parias (mythology) =

Son of Philomelus

In Greek mythology, Parias (pronunciation: par-EE-is) was a son of Philomelus and a grandson of Iasion. Parias gave his name to the Parians and the city of Parion (a town in Mysia on the Hellespont).
