= Parrhasius (mythology) =

Parrhasius (Ancient Greek: Παρράσιος) was, in Greek mythology, the name of two individuals:

- Parrhasius or Parrhasus, an Arcadian prince as one of the 50 sons of the impious King Lycaon either by the naiad Cyllene, Nonacris or by unknown woman. In some accounts, his father was Zeus. Parrhasius was also called the father of Arcas who had the region named after him. He was a hero and founder of the Arcadian city of Parrhasia.
- Parrhasius, twin brother of Lycastus and son of Ares and Phylonome, daughter of Nyctimus and Arcadia. Their mother them into the river Erymanthus but they survived when a wolf suckled them and a shepherd, Gyliphus, reared them. Parrhasius succeeded later to the throne of Arcadia.

It was also an adjective used by ancient Greek poets as equivalent to "Arcadian", from the name of Parrhasia (Arcadia), a district in the south of Arcadia. It was a surname of Apollo, who had a sanctuary on the Arcadian Mount Lycaeus, where an annual festival was held in his honour, celebrating him as the Epicurius (the helper).
