= Pegasides =

Name of the Muses in Greek mythology

In Greek mythology, Pegasides (Greek: Πηγασίδες, singular: Πηγασίς) is a name applied to the Muses. It originates from the name of the mythical horse Pegasus, or from that of a fountain which was created by Pegasus.

== Background ==
According to Greek mythological tradition the winged horse Pegasus was the son of Poseidon, sea and river god of the Greeks, equivalent to the Roman Neptune. The hero Bellerophon needed the untamed Pegasus to help him defeat the monster Chimera. Hence, while Pegasus was drinking at the spring Pirene in Corinth, Bellerophon caught him. Pegasus, startled, struck a rock with his hoof, creating the spring Hippocrene on Mount Helicon.

== The Pegasides ==
The name pegasides (plural form of the Greek feminine adjective pegasis) literally means "originating from or linked with Pegasus". Hence, in poetry, the waters and streams of Hippocrene and other springs that arose from the hoofprints of Pegasus are called pegasides. The Muses are likewise called pegasides because the spring Hippocrene was sacred to them. Pegasis, the singular form, is applied by the Roman poet Ovid as a by-name or adjective to the nymph Oenone, daughter of the river-god Cebrenus.

Pegasis is used by the Greek author Quintus Smyrnaeus as the name of a nymph who had sex with the Trojan prince Emathion and gave birth beside the river Granicus to Atymnius. The latter was eventually killed by Odysseus in the Trojan War.

== Gallery ==
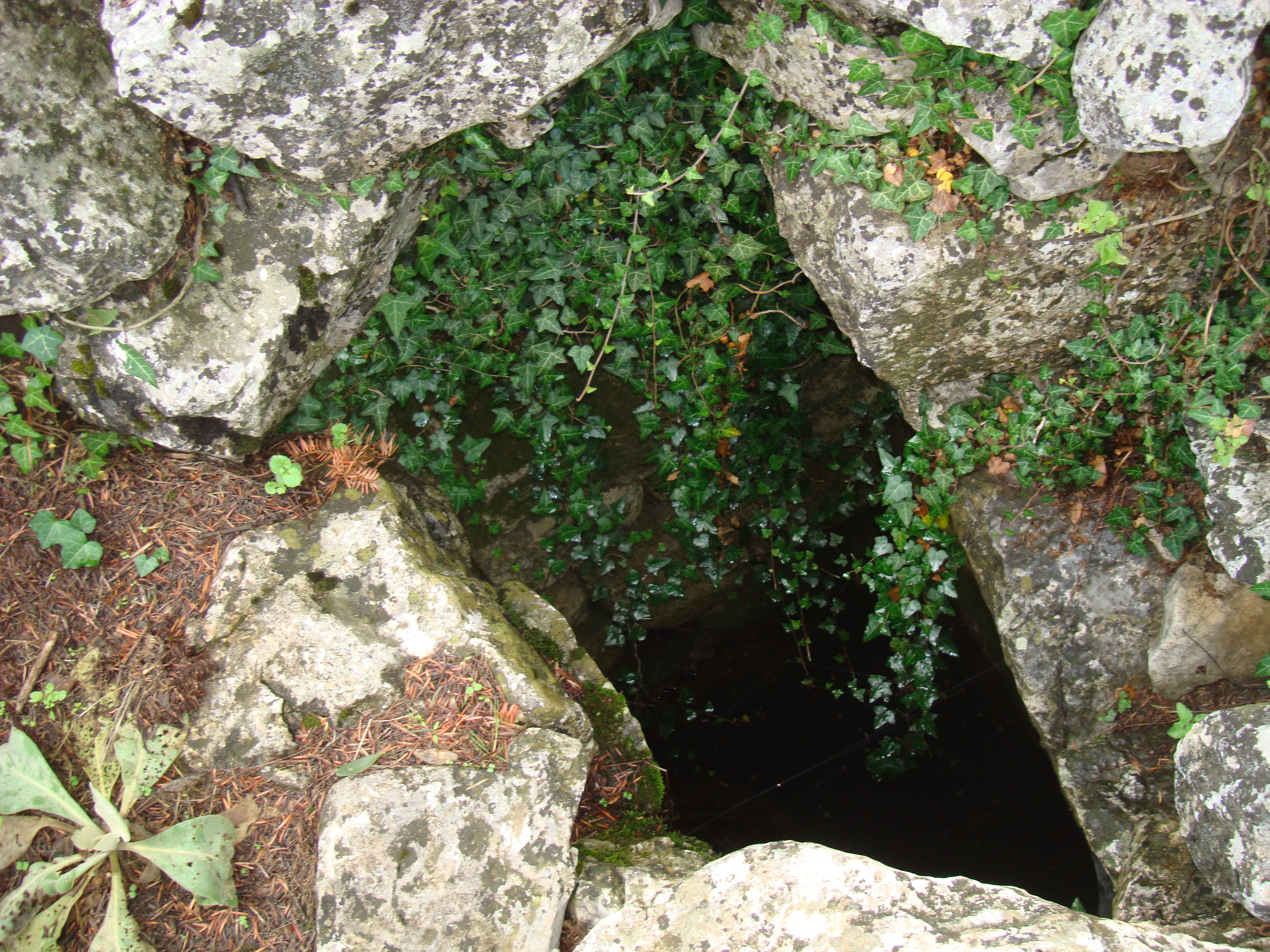
The spring Hippocrene, haunt of mythological Pegasides

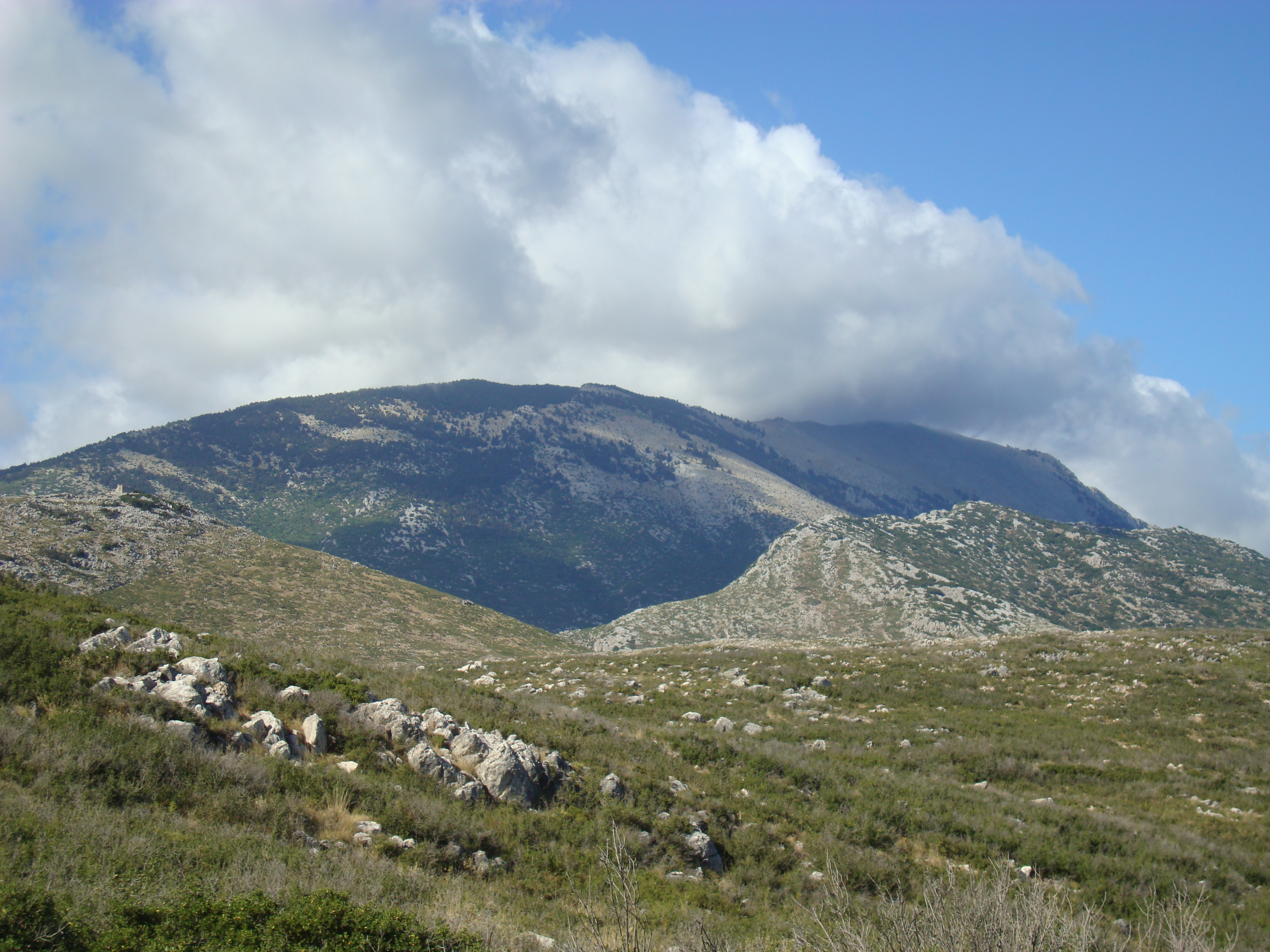
Mount Helicon where Pegasus created the spring Hippocrene

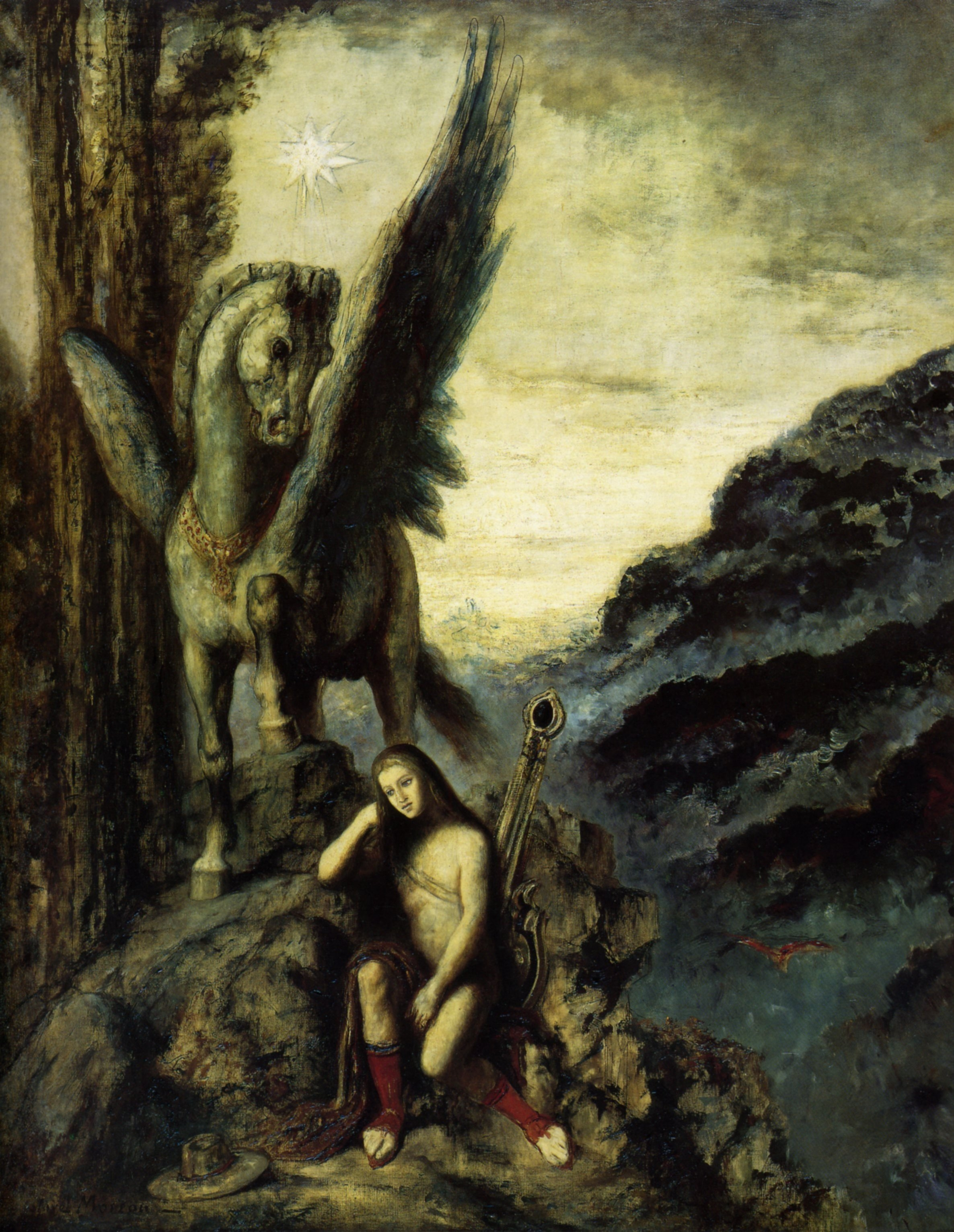
Pegasus and Bellerophon by Gustave Moreau, 19th century
