= Lycastus =

Lycastus (Λύκαστος) may refer to:

- Lycastus, a Cretan king and son of Minos I and Itone. He was the husband of Ida, daughter of Corybas, and by her father of Minos II.
- Lycastus, twin brother of Parrhasius, whose parents were Ares and Phylonome, daughter of Nyctimus and Arcadia. Their mother was seduced by Ares in the guise of a shepherd; in fear of her father's wrath, she cast the newborn twins into the river Erymanthus. They did not drown and were washed into the hollow of an oak tree, where a she-wolf found and suckled them, giving up her own cubs. The twins were then adopted and raised by a shepherd named Gyliphus, and eventually succeeded to the throne of Arcadia. Their story is closely parallel, and is cited as such by Pseudo-Plutarch, to that of Romulus and Remus.
- Lycastus, lover of Eulimene, who unsuccessfully attempted to save his loved one from being sacrificed.
- Lycastus, an autochthon, eponym of the town Lycastus in Crete, which might as well have been named after the son of Minos.
