= Emathion =

Set index of mythical characters

In Greek mythology, the name Emathion (Ancient Greek: Ἠμαθίων) refers to four individuals.

- Emathion, king of Aethiopia or Arabia, the son of Tithonus and Eos, and brother of Memnon. Herakles killed him after coming across the valley of the Nile on his way to steal the golden apples of the Hesperis, and gave his kingdom to Memnon. According to a rumor, Emathion wanted to prevent Herakles from stealing the golden apples. A different legend tells that the father of Romus, who founded Rome, was Emathion.
- Emathion, king of Samothrace, was the son of Zeus and Electra (one of the Pleiades), brother to Dardanus, Iasion (Eetion), and (rarely) Harmonia. He sent soldiers to join Dionysus in his Indian campaigns.
- Emathion, was aged Aethiopian courtier of Cepheus in Ethiopia. He "feared the gods and stood for upright deeds". Emathion was killed by Chromis during the fight between Phineus and Perseus.
- Emathion, a Trojan prince, and the father of Atymnius by the naiad Pegasis
- In the Aeneid, Emathion is one of the companions of Aeneas in Italy. He was slain by Liger, an ally of Turnus, the opponent of Aeneas.
