= Idaeus =

Idaeus or Idaios (Ancient Greek: Ἰδαῖος) is a given name, with the etymological meaning "pertaining to Mount Ida" (for example as an epithet of Zeus or Heracles). People with the name include:

== Mythological ==
- Idaeus, a Trojan herald, son and charioteer of Priam
- Idaeus, a Trojan, son of Dares
- Idaeus, son of Socus, one of the Korybantes
- Idaeus, son of Dardanus, one of the legendary founders of Troy
- Idaeus, one of the three sons (along with Corythus and Bunomus) that Helen of Troy had with Paris, according to Dictys Cretensis

== Historical ==
- Idaeus of Cyrene, winner of the foot-race in the 126th Olympiad (275 BC)
- Idaeus of Rhodes, son of Lissos, ancient Greek epic poet
