= Zacynthus (mythology) =

- Eponymous founder of Zacynthus
- Member of the Dardanian Royal Family
- Abode: (1) Arcadia or (2) Dardania

Genealogy
- Parents: Dardanus and Batea
- Siblings: Erichthonius, Ilus and (possibly) Idaea

In Greek mythology Zacynthus (Ancient Greek: Ζάκυνθος, romanized: Zakynthos) was a Psophidian who became the founder of a colony in the island of Zacynthus, which derived its name from him. The name, like all similar names ending in -nthos, is pre-Mycenaean or Pelasgian in origin.

== Mythology ==
Zacynthus was the son of the legendary Arcadian chief Dardanus by his wife Bateia, daughter of Teucer. He was the brother of Erichthonius and probably, Ilus and Idaea. Zacynthus was the first man to sail across the island opposite the coast of Elis and became its first settler which was afterwards called Zacynthus after him.

Zacynthus is depicted on the flag of Zakynthos.
