= Ida (mother of Minos) =

Daughter of Corybas in Greek mythology

In Greek mythology, Ida or Idê (Ancient Greek: Ἴδη, romanized: Idē, lit. 'timber' or 'woodland'; pronounced /ˈiː.də/ or /ˈiː.daː/, EE-də or EE-dah) was the daughter of Corybas, who gave his name to the Corybantes. Her possible mother was Thebe, daughter of Cilix. Ida married Lycastus, the king of Crete, who was the son of Minos I, the first king of Crete. She bore Lycastus a son, also named Minos, who succeeded his father as the "second" king Minos of Crete.
