= Eetion (mythology) =

In Greek mythology, Eëtion (Ancient Greek: Ἠετίων Ēetíōn [ɛː.e.tí.ɔːn]) may refer to the following personages:

- Eëtion, another name of Iasion in some myths.
- Eëtion, king of the Cilician Thebe and father of Andromache and Podes. He was slain by when the latter sacked the town.
- Eëtion, ruler over the island of Imbros mentioned in the Iliad. Achilles sold the Trojan prince Lycaon, son of King Priam of Troy, whom he had taken prisoner, to Euneus, king of Lemnos, but Eetion paid a great ransom for him and sent him to Arisbe, a city in the Troad to be returned to his father. However, twelve days afterward Lycaon fell once more into the hands of his killer Achilles.
- Eëtion, the "bold" Greek soldier who participated in the Trojan War. He was shot dead by Paris during the siege of Troy. "Yet again did Paris shoot at bold Eetion. Through his jaw leapt the sudden-flashing brass: he groaned, and with his blood were mingled tears."
