= Philonome (mythology) =

Women in Greek mythology

In Greek mythology, Philonome or Phylonome (Ancient Greek: Φιλονόμη) was a name shared by two individuals:

- Phylonome, daughter of Nyctimus (son of Lycaon) and Arcadia. She was a maiden who used to hunt with Artemis until Ares seduced her in the guise of a shepherd. Being pregnant and fearing her father, she cast her twin children, Lycastus and Parrhasius, into the river Erymanthus, but they found haven in the trunk of a tree. Later a wolf suckled the children and a shepherd, Gyliphus, reared them as if they were his own sons.
- Philonome, also called Polyboea or Scamandria, daughter of Tragasus and second wife of King Cycnus of Colonae. She fell in love with her stepson Tenes and, being rejected, falsely accused him before Cycnus of having had sex with her. But when her husband discovered the truth, he buried her alive in the earth.
