= Satrapes =

God in the Palmyrene pantheon

Satrapes was a god in the Palmyrene pantheon, the name occurring in Syrian inscriptions from Palmyra and the Hauran. Pausanias (vi.25, 26) mentions 'Satrapes' as the name of a god who had a statue and a cult in Elis and is identified with Korybas.

The origin of this 'god' is obscure. It may have arisen from a cult identifying the divine and royal aspect of the satrap's power, in a similar fashion to many deified personifications in Roman paganism, i.e. the goddess Pietas.
