= Dardanus (son of Zeus) =

Greek mythological figure

- Eponymous king of Dardania
- Member of the Dardanian Royal Family
- Dardanus (with petasus and spears) chases Eos, who pursues his descendant Tithonus. Attic red-figure skyphos by the Pantoxena Painter, 450–440 BC.
- Predecessor: Teucer
- Successor: Erichthonius or Ilus I
- Abode: (1) Arcadia, then Samothrace and Troad or (2) Hesperia (or Italy), then Troad

Genealogy
- Parents: (1) Zeus and Electra (2) Corythus and Electra
- Siblings: (1) & (2) Iasion (or Iasus or Eetion), Harmonia and (1) Emathion
- Consort: (i) Chryse (ii) Olizone (iii) Batea or Arisbe
- Children: (i) Idaeus and Deimas (ii) & (iii) Erichthonius (iii) Ilus I, Idaea and Zacynthus

In Greek mythology, Dardanus (/ˈdɑːrdənəs/; Ancient Greek: Δάρδανος, romanized: Dardanos) was the founder of the city of Dardanus at the foot of Mount Ida in the Troad.

Dardanus, a son of Zeus and the Pleiad Electra, was a significant figure in Greek mythology. He was the brother of Iasion and sometimes of Harmonia and Emathion. Originally from Arcadia, Dardanus married Chryse, with whom he fathered two sons, Idaeus and Deimas. After a great flood, Dardanus and his people settled on the island of Samothrace before eventually moving to Asia Minor due to the land's poor quality. In Virgil's Aeneid, Dardanus is said to have originally come from Italy, where his mother Electra was married to Corythus, the king of Tarquinia.

Dardanus later married Batea, the daughter of King Teucer, and founded the city of Dardanus on Mount Ida, which became the capital of his kingdom. He also founded the city of Thymbra and expanded his kingdom by waging successful wars against his neighbors. Dardanus had several children with Batea, including Ilus, Erichthonius, Idaea, and Zacynthus. He reigned for 64 or 65 years before being succeeded by his son Erichthonius or, in some accounts, Ilus.

Dardanus has been the subject of various operas by composers such as Jean-Philippe Rameau, Carl Stamitz, and Antonio Sacchini.

== Family ==
Dardanus was a son of Zeus and the Pleiad Electra, daughter of Atlas but one author claims that his real father was the Corythus, an Italian king. He was the brother of Iasion and sometimes of Harmonia and Emathion.

== Mythology ==
Dionysius of Halicarnassus (1.61–62) states that Dardanus' original home was in Arcadia, where Dardanus and his elder brother Iasus (elsewhere more commonly called Iasion) reigned as kings following Atlas. Dardanus married Chryse, daughter of Pallas (son of Lycaon), by whom he fathered two sons: Idaeus and Deimas. When a great flood occurred, the survivors, who were living on mountains that had now become islands, split into two groups: one group remained and took Deimas as king while the other sailed away, eventually settling in the island of Samothrace. There Iasus (Iasion) was slain by Zeus for lying with Demeter. Dardanus and his people found the land poor and so most of them set sail for Asia Minor.

A different account in Virgil's Aeneid (3.163f) has Aeneas in a dream learn from his ancestral Penates that "Dardanus and Father Iasius" and the Penates themselves originally came from Hesperia, afterwards renamed as Italy. This tradition holds that Dardanus was a Tyrrhenian prince, and that his mother Electra was married to Corythus, king of Tarquinia.

Other accounts make no mention of Arcadia or Hesperia, though they sometimes mention a flood and speak of Dardanus sailing on a hide-raft (as part of the flood story?) from Samothrace to the Troad near Abydos. All accounts agree that Dardanus came to the Troad from Samothrace and was there welcomed by King Teucer. Dardanus married Batea the daughter of Teucer. (Dionysius mentions that Dardanus' first wife Chryse had died.) Dardanus received land on Mount Ida from his father-in-law. There Dardanus founded the city of Dardanus which became the capital of his kingdom. He later founded the city of Thymbra in honor of his friend Thymbraeus, who is said to have been killed by Dardanus. Dardanus waged war successfully against his neighbors, especially distinguishing himself against the Paphlagonians and thereby extending the boundaries of his kingdom with considerable acquisitions.

The strait of the Dardanelles (yellow) takes its name from Dardanus.

Dardanus' children by Batea were Ilus, Erichthonius, Idaea and Zacynthus. Ilus died before his father. According to Dionysius of Halicarnassus, Zacynthus was the first settler on the island afterwards called Zacynthus. Dardanus' sons by Chryse, his first wife, were Idaeus and Dimas. Dionysius says (1.61.4) that Dimas and Idaeus founded colonies in Asia Minor. Idaeus gave his name to the Idaean mountains, that is Mount Ida, where he built a temple to the Mother of the Gods (Cybele) and instituted mysteries and ceremonies still observed in Phrygia in Dionysius's time. According to Dictys Cretensis, his wife was called Olizone, daughter of Phineus and became the mother of Erichthonius. In other accounts, the wife of Dardanus was called Arisbe, daughter of King Teucer of Crete or King Macareus of Lesbos.

Dardanus reigned for 64 or 65 years and was succeeded by his son Erichthonius or in some accounts, Ilus.

== Cultural depictions ==
There are operas on the subject of Dardanus by Jean-Philippe Rameau (1739), Carl Stamitz (1770) and Antonio Sacchini (1784).

Sketches of Étienne Lainez as the titular Dardanus in the opera by Sacchini.

== Family tree ==
Trojan race

Oceanus	Tethys
Atlas	Pleione	Scamander	Idaea	Simoeis
Zeus/Jupiter	Electra	Teucer
Dardanus	Batea
Ilus	Erichthonius	Astyoche
Callirrhoe	Tros
Ilus	Ganymede	Assaracus	Hieromneme
Laomedon	Themiste	Capys
Priam	Anchises	Aphrodite/Venus	Latinus
Creusa	Aeneas	Lavinia
Ascanius	Silvius
Aeneas Silvius
Latinus Silvius
Alba
Atys
Capys
Capetus
Tiberinus Silvius
Agrippa
Romulus Silvius
Aventinus
Procas
Numitor	Amulius
Ares/Mars	Rhea Silvia/Ilia
Hersilia	Romulus	Remus
