= Phineus =

In Greek mythology, a king of Salmydessus

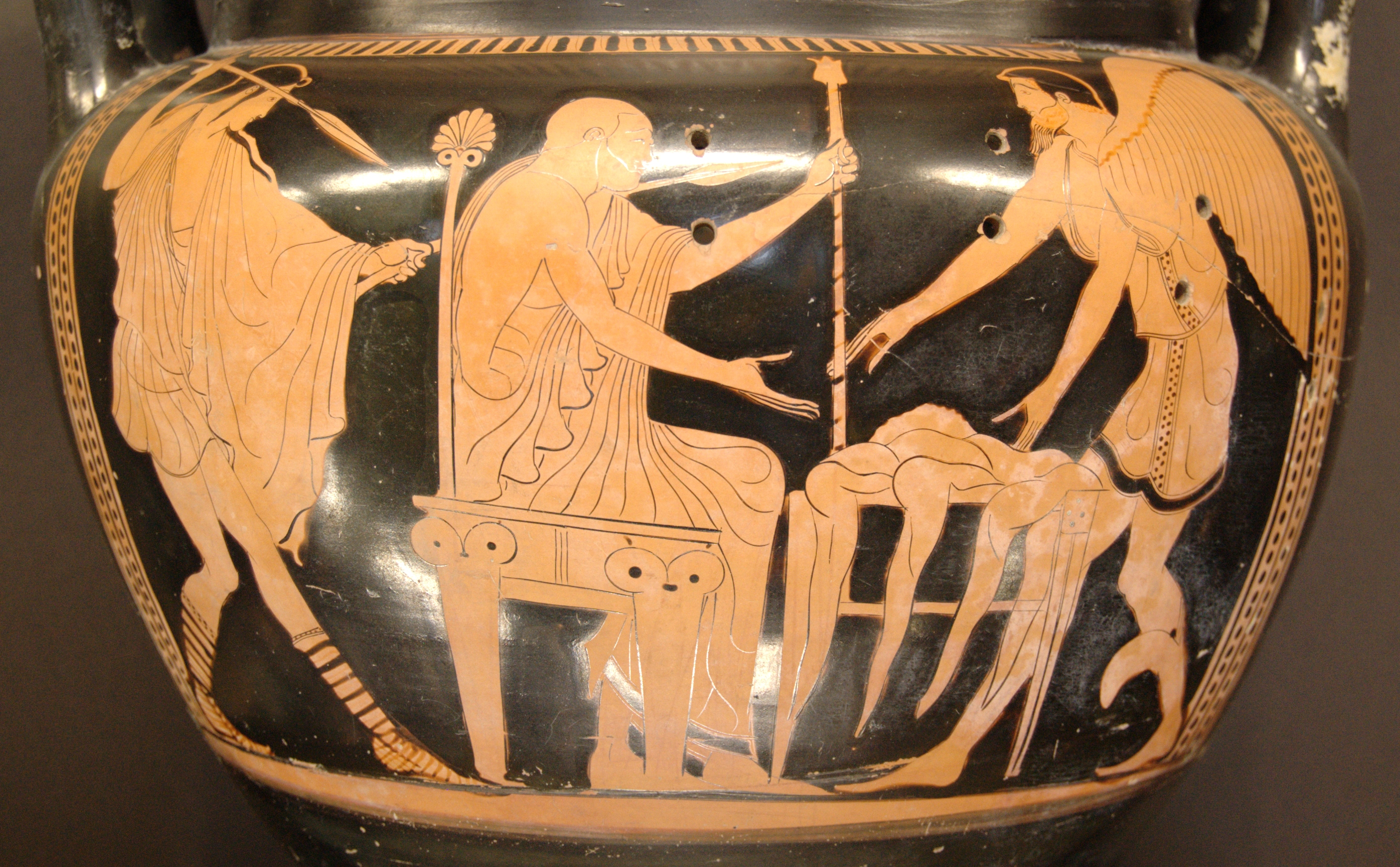
Phineus with the Boreads.

In Greek mythology, Phineus (/ˈfɪniəs, ˈfɪn.juːs/; Ancient Greek: Φινεύς, romanized: Phineús [pʰiːneǔs]) was a king of Salmydessus in Thrace and seer, who appears in accounts of the Argonauts' voyage. Some accounts make him a king in Paphlagonia or in Arcadia.

== Family ==
Several different versions of Phineus's parentage were presented in ancient texts. According to Apollonius of Rhodes, he was a son of Agenor, but the Bibliotheca says that other authors named his father as Poseidon (who is the father of Agenor). The Hesiodic Catalogue of Women, on the other hand, reported that Phineus was the son of Phoenix and Cassiopeia.

His first wife was Cleopatra, daughter of Boreas and Oreithyia, by whom he had a pair of sons, named Plexippus and Pandion, or Gerymbas and Aspondus, or Polydector (Polydectus) and Polydorus, or Parthenius and Crambis, or Oryithus (Oarthus) and Crambis. His second wife, Idaea, daughter of the Scythian king Dardanus (less commonly Eidothea, sister of Cadmus, or Eurytia), deceived him into blinding these sons, a fate Phineus himself would suffer.

By his second wife, or by a Scythian concubine, Phineus had two more sons, Mariandynus and Thynus. According to some sources, he also had two daughters, Eraseia and Harpyreia, while another daughter Olizone was called the wife of Dardanus, who was the son of Zeus and Electra, and became the mother of Erichthonius.

Comparative table of Phineus' family
Relation	Names	Source													
Relation	Names	Homer	Hesiod	Sophocles	Apollon.			Diodo.	Ovid	Valer.	Apollod.	Dictys	Nonnus	Tzetzes	Unknown
Relation	Names	Sch. Ody.	Ehoiai	Sch. Anti.	Argo.	Sch.		Diodo.	Sch. Ibis	Valer.	Apollod.	Dictys	Nonnus	Tzetzes	Unknown
Parentage	Phoenix and Cassiopeia		✓			✓									
Parentage	Agenor				✓						✓				
Parentage	Poseidon										✓				
Wife	Cleopatra (1st wife)				✓			✓		✓	✓		✓		
Wife	Idaea							✓			✓				
Wife	Eurytia	✓													
Wife	Eidothea			✓											
Wife	Dia						✓								
Wife	First wife					✓									
Children	Gerymbas			✓											
Children	Aspondus			✓											
Children	Parthenius					✓									
Children	Crambis					✓									
Children	Mariandynus						✓								
Children	Thynus						✓								
Children	Polydector (Polydectus)								✓						
Children	Polydorus								✓						
Children	Plexippus										✓				
Children	Pandion										✓				
Children	Olizone											✓			
Children	Eraseia													✓	
Children	Harpyreia													✓	
Children	Oryithus (Oarthus)														✓
Children	Crambis														✓

== Mythology ==
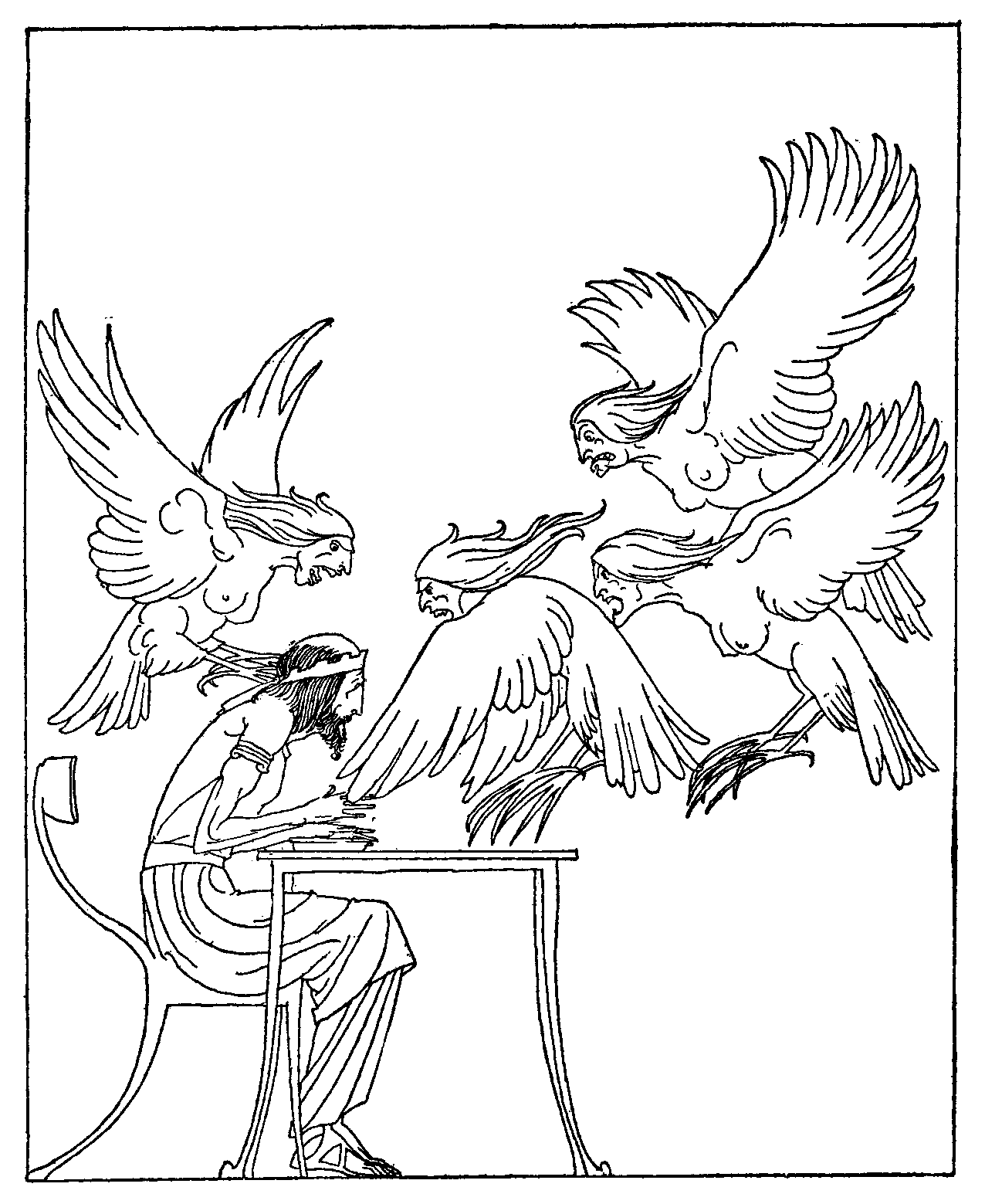
Phineus being tormented by the Harpies

Apollo was said to have given the gift of prophecy to Phineus, but the latter's own blinding was variously attributed to the outrage against his sons, his giving Phrixus directions on his journey, or because he preferred long life to sight, or, as reported in the Argonautica (thus the best-known version), for revealing the future to mankind. For this reason he was also tormented by the Harpies, who stole or defiled whatever food he had at hand or, according to the Catalogue of Women, drove Phineus himself to the corners of the world. According to scholia on the Odyssey, when asked by Zeus if he preferred to die or lose sight as punishment for having his sons killed by their stepmother, Phineus chose the latter saying he would rather never see the sun, and consequently it was the scorned Helios who sent the Harpies against him. In yet another version, he blinded Phineus at the request of his son Aeëtes, who asked him to do so because Phineus offered his assistance to Aeëtes' enemies. Alternatively the agent of punishment was Poseidon. However the Harpies plagued him, deliverance from this curse motivated Phineus's involvement in the voyage of the Argo. Those accounts in which Phineus is stated to have blinded his sons, add that they had their sight restored to them by the sons of Boreas, or by Asclepius.

When the ship landed by his Thracian home, Phineus described his torment to the crew and told them that his brothers-in-law, the wing-footed Boreads, both Argonauts, were fated to deliver him from the Harpies. Zetes demurred, fearing the wrath of the gods should they deliver Phineus from divine punishment, but the old seer assured him that he and his brother Calais would face no retribution. A trap was set: Phineus sat down to a meal with the Boreads standing guard, and as soon as he touched his food the Harpies swept down, devoured the food and flew off. The Boreads gave chase, pursuing the Harpies as far as the "Floating Islands" before Iris stopped them lest they kill the Harpies against the will of the gods. She swore an oath by the Styx that the Harpies would no longer harass Phineus, and the Boreads then turned back to return to the Argonauts. It is for this reason, according to Apollonius, that the "Floating Islands" are now called the Strophades, the "Turning Islands". Phineus then revealed to the Argonauts the path their journey would take and informed them how to pass the Symplegades safely, thus partially filling the same role for Jason that Circe did for Odysseus in the Odyssey.

A now-lost play about Phineus, Phineus, was written by Aeschylus and was the first play in the trilogy that included The Persians, produced in 472 B.C. Eventually, Helios transformed Phineus into a mole, a blind creature, over some unspecific insult.

The story of Phineus and Cleopatra is briefly mentioned in Sophocles' Antigone.
