= Philomelus =

Greek demi-god

- Inventor of the chariot
- Other names: Philomêlos, Philomenus, Philomenos

Genealogy
- Parents: Iasion and Demeter
- Siblings: Plutus, Corybas, Despoina, Persephone, Iacchus, Arion
- Children: Parias

In Greek mythology, Philomelus, Philomelos, Philomenus or Philomenos (/ˌfɪləˈmiːləs/; Greek: Φιλόμηλος, romanized: Philómêlos; /fɪˈlɒmɪnəs/; Greek: Φιλόμηνος, romanized: Philómēnos) was a demigod and inventor of the wagon that became Ursa Major. His name means 'friend of ease' from philos and mêlos.

== Family ==
Philomelus was the son of Demeter and Iasion, and the brother of Plutus. His son Parias gave his name to the Parians and the city of Parion (a town in Mysia on the Hellespont).

== Mythology ==
Plutus was very wealthy, but would share none of his riches with his brother. Out of necessity, Philomelus bought two oxen, invented the wagon (Note: sometimes plough), and supported himself by ploughing his fields and cultivating crops. His mother, admiring him for this, put him in the heavens as the constellation Boötes.
