= Aenus (mythology) =

Greek mythological character

In Greek mythology, Aenus (Ancient Greek: Αἶνον, romanized: Ainos, lit. 'praise', 'commendation' or 'fable/ parable') a Ceteian soldier who participated in the Trojan War. During the siege of Troy, he was slain by Odysseus using his spear along with Polydorus, another Ceteian.
