= Iasion =

Founder of Samothracian rites

Stucco painting with Demeter and Iasion in the Netherlands.

In Greek mythology, Iasion /aɪˈeɪʒən/ (Ancient Greek: Ἰασίων, romanized: Iasíōn) or Iasus /ˈaɪəsəs/ (Ancient Greek: Ἴασος, romanized: Íasos), also called Eetion /iːˈɛʃən/ (Ancient Greek: Ἠετίων, romanized: Ēetíōn), was the founder of the mystic rites on the island of Samothrace.

== Family ==
According to the mythographer Apollodorus, Iasion is the son of the Pleiad Electra and Zeus, and the brother of Dardanus and possibly Emathion. Both Hellanicus and Diodorus Siculus repeat this parentage, adding Harmonia as his sister. According to an Italian version of the genealogy, Iasion and Dardanus are both Electra's sons, and are both born in Italy, with Iasion fathered by Corythus and Dardanus by Zeus. In the Fabulae (attributed to Gaius Julius Hyginus), Iasion is called the son of Ilithyius.

With Demeter, Iasion was the father of Plutus, the god of wealth. According to Hyginus' De astronomia, Iasion was also the father of Philomelus, while, according to Diodorus Siculus, he was the father of a son named Corybas with Cybele.

== Mythology ==
At the marriage of Cadmus and Harmonia, Iasion was lured by Demeter away from the other revelers. They had intercourse as Demeter lay on her back in a freshly plowed furrow. When they rejoined the celebration, Zeus guessed what had happened because of the mud on Demeter's backside, and out of envy, killed Iasion (his own son) with a thunderbolt. In one account, his death was caused by his impiety to the statue of Demeter instead. Servius, in his commentary upon Virgil's Aeneid, states that Iasion was killed by his brother Dardanus, whereas Hyginus attributes his death to horses. Ovid, in contrast, says that Iasion lived to an old age as the husband of Demeter.

Some versions of this myth conclude with Iasion and the agricultural hero Triptolemus then becoming the Gemini constellation.
