= Mydon =

Figures in Greek mythology

There are at least two figures named Mydon (Ancient Greek: Μύδων, gen.: Μύδωνος) in Greek mythology:

- Mydon, one of the defenders of Troy in Homer's Iliad. In Book V, he is mentioned as being killed by Antilochus.
- Mydon, a Paeonian warrior defending Troy. He was killed by Achilles.
