= Asclepiades of Tragilus =

Ancient Greek mythographer

Asclepiades of Tragilus (Greek: Ἀσκληπιάδης) was an ancient Greek literary critic and mythographer of the 4th century BC, and a student of the Athenian orator Isocrates. His works do not survive, but he is known to have written the Tragodoumena (Τραγῳδούμενα, "The Subjects of Tragedy"), in which he discussed the treatment of myths in Greek tragedy. The Tragodoumena is sometimes considered the first systematic mythography. Asclepiades summarized the plots of myths as dramatized in tragedy, and provided details and variants. He is one of the authors (= FGrHist 12) whose fragments were collected in Felix Jacoby's Die Fragmente der griechischen Historiker. He is cited twice in the work traditionally known as the Library of Apollodorus.

A gloss on Vergil's phrase Idaeis cyparissis ("cypresses of Ida") mentions that Asclepiades preserved a Celtic version of the myth of Cyparissus, in which a female Cyparissa is the daughter of a Celtic king named Boreas.
