= Pandion (mythology) =

Multiple men in Greek mythology

In Greek mythology, Pandion (/pænˈdaɪɒn/; Ancient Greek: Πανδίων, romanized: Pandíōn, lit. 'all-divine') may refer to the following characters:

- Pandion I, a legendary king of Athens, father of Erechtheus, Butes, Procne and Philomela. Sometimes also said to be the father of Chelidon as well.
- Pandion II, a legendary king of Athens, father of the brothers Aegeus, Pallas, Nisos and Lycus.
- Pandion (hero), the eponymous hero of the Attic tribe Pandionis, usually assumed to be one of the legendary Athenian kings Pandion I or Pandion II.
- Pandion, the father of Chelidon, interpreted by some scholars to be a separate figure from King Pandion I and perhaps a doublet of Pandareus, Chelidon's father in other versions.
- Pandion, an Egyptian prince as son of Aegyptus and Hephaestine. He married Callidice, daughter of Danaus who killed him during their wedding night.
- Pandion, son of Phineus and Cleopatra, brother of Plexippus. He and his brother were blinded by Phineus at the instigation of their stepmother Idaea.
- Pandion, from Phaistos in Crete, was father of Lamprus.
- Pandion, an Achaean warrior who carried the bow of Teucer during the Trojan War.
- Pandion, father of a certain Helen who consorted with Zeus and bore him a son, Musaeus.
