= Polydorus (son of Astyanax) =

Mythological Trojan prince

In Greek mythology, Polydorus or Polydore (/ˌpɒlɪˈdɔːrəs/; Ancient Greek: Πολύδωρος, i.e. "many-gift[ed]") was the son of Astyanax, prince of Troy. Astyanax was killed by either Neoptolemos (Achilles' son) or by Odysseus. According to another legend, Astyanax was brought to Greece by Neoptolemos.

In Frankish legend, Polydore was an ancestor of Clovis I, Peppin III and Charlemagne.
