= Corythus (son of Paris) =

Son of Paris in Greek mythology

In Greek mythology, Corythus (Ancient Greek: Κόρυθος, romanized: Kóruthos) is a minor Trojan figure who lived during the decade-spanning Trojan War. He was the son of Prince Paris of Troy by either the nymph Oenone or the Spartan queen Helen.

In the former account, Corythus was killed by his father after arriving in Troy and being spotted in Helen's bedroom. In the latter, he perished as a result of a roof collapsing on top of him.

== Family ==
Corythus is the son of the Trojan prince Paris, either by his first wife Oenone or by his second wife Helen. As the son of Helen, he had four full-siblings: brothers Bunomus, Aganus and Idaeus, as well a sister named after their mother.

== Mythology ==
According to most authors, Corythus was son of Oenone, Paris' previous wife before he deserted her for the love of Helen. The jealous and hurt Oenone sent Corythus out with instructions to stir trouble among the Trojans, planning ill for Helen and making Paris jealous.

He was first sent by Oenone to inform the Greeks of the prophecies required to take Troy: a member of the Aeacidae, the bones of Pelops, and Heracles' arrows. Lycophron further references Corythus informing the invading army about the land, being a spy or traitor, alluding to a version in which the Greeks found Troy thanks to Corythus' information. Later, having reportedly grown to be even more good-looking than his father, Corythus travelled to Troy itself. There, he was received warmly by Helen and even fell in love with her. Seeing Corythus next to Helen in her bedroom, Paris slew him, not knowing this was his own son. Oenone then cursed Paris to be wounded severely by the Achaeans. She intended that he would be forced to ask for her assistance and be at her need. When that day came, Oenone refused to help. After Paris died, she repented and hanged herself.

In his commentary to Vergil's Aeneid, Servius mentions that Corythus founded a settlement in Italy named after himself.

Alternatively, according to the poet Nicander, among others, Corythus was the son of Paris and his second wife Helen. In these versions, he is said to have died alongside his brothers after a roof in Troy collapsed upon them.

== See also ==
Other stories with unwitting kinslaying include:

- Telephus
- Leucippus
- Procris
- Telegonus

== Bibliography ==
- Avery, Catherine B., ed. (1962). New Century Classical Handbook. New York, US: Appleton-Century-Crofts.
- Bell, Robert E. (1991). Women of Classical Mythology: A Biographical Dictionary. ABC-Clio. ISBN 9780874365818.
- Conon, Fifty Narrations, surviving as one-paragraph summaries in the Bibliotheca (Library) of Photius, Patriarch of Constantinople, translated from the Greek by Brady Kiesling. Online text available at topos.text.
- Dictys Cretensis, from The Trojan War. The Chronicles of Dictys of Crete and Dares the Phrygian, translated by Richard McIlwaine Frazer Jr. (1931-), Indiana University Press. 1966. Online text at topos.text.
- Fowler, Robert L. (2000). Early Greek Mythography. Vol. 2: Commentary. Oxford, UK: Oxford University Press. ISBN 978-0-19-814741-1.
- Gantz, Timothy (1993). Early Greek Myth: A Guide to Literary and Artistic Sources. Vol. II. Baltimore and London: The Johns Hopkins University Press. ISBN 0-8018-4410-X.
- Grant, Michael; Hazel, John (August 2, 2004). Who's Who in Classical Mythology. London and New York: Routledge. ISBN 0-415-26041-8.
- Grimal, Pierre (1987). The Dictionary of Classical Mythology. Wiley-Blackwell. ISBN 0-631-13209-0.
- Hard, Robin (2004). The Routledge Handbook of Greek Mythology: Based on H.J. Rose's "Handbook of Greek Mythology". Routledge. ISBN 9780415186360.
- Lycophron, Alexandra (or Cassandra) in Callimachus and Lycophron with an English translation by A. W. Mair ; Aratus, with an English translation by G. R. Mair, London: W. Heinemann, New York: G. P. Putnam 1921. Internet Archive.
- March, Jennifer R. (May 31, 2014). Dictionary of Classical Mythology. Oxbow Books. ISBN 978-1-78297-635-6.
- Parthenius, Love Romances translated by Sir Stephen Gaselee (1882-1943), S. Loeb Classical Library Volume 69. Cambridge, MA. Harvard University Press. 1916. Online version at the Topos Text Project.
- Smith, William (1873). A Dictionary of Greek and Roman Biography and Mythology. London, UK: John Murray, printed by Spottiswoode and Co. Online version at the Perseus.tufts library.
- Tzetzes, John, Scholia to Lycophron's Alexandra, marginal notes by Isaak and Ioannis Tzetzes and others, from the Greek edition of Eduard Scheer (Weidmann 1881) (downloadable at archive.org, translated by CHATGPT 4.0 with more speed than accuracy, with prompts and work-arounds by Bruce Hartzler and a few manual improvements (?) by Brady Kiesling. Online text available at topos.text.
