= Oenone =

Nymph of Greek mythology

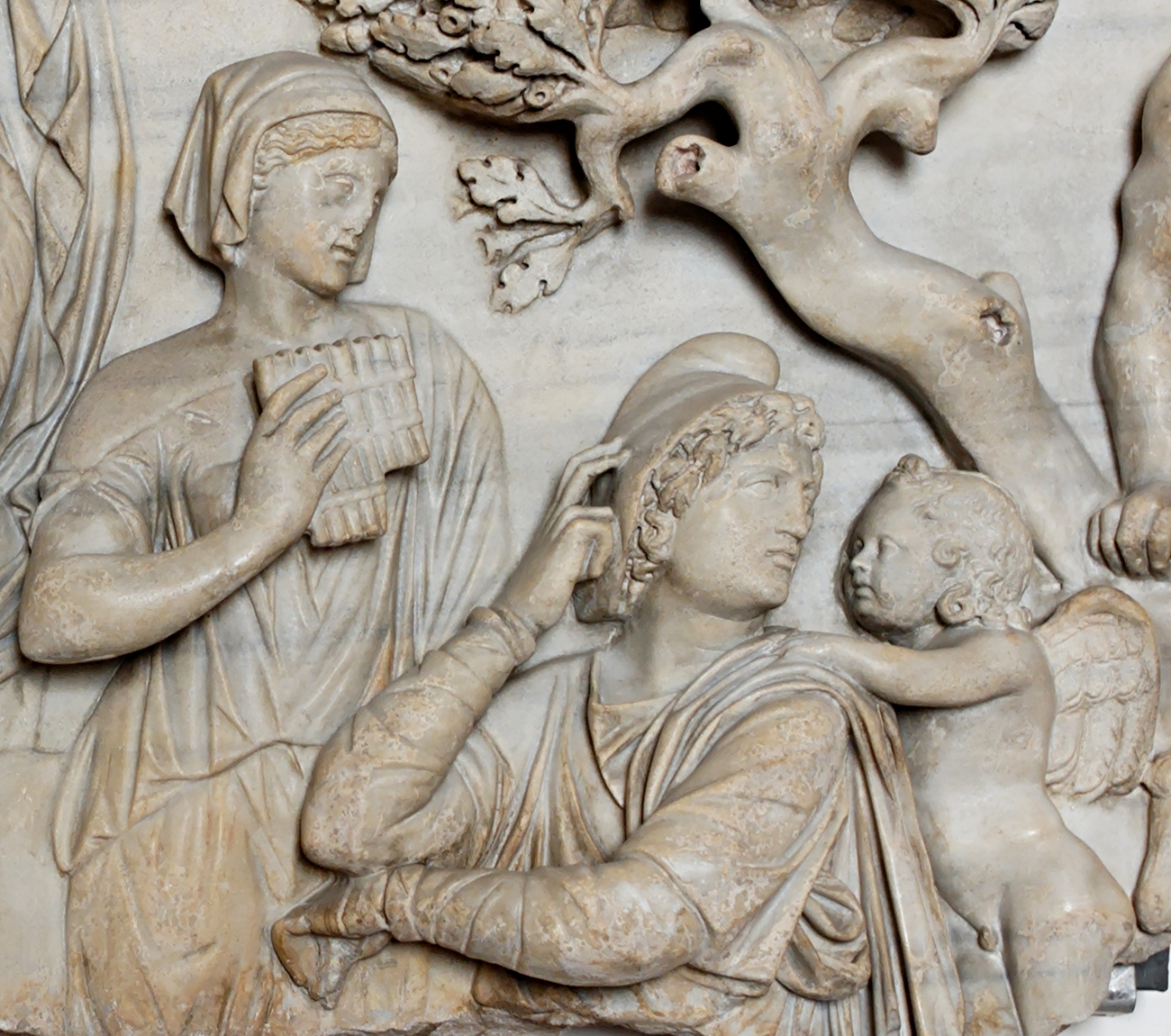
Oenone holding pan pipes, behind Paris and Eros – a detail from a sarcophagus with the Judgement of Paris, Roman, Hadrianic period (Palazzo Altemps, Rome)

In Greek mythology, Oenone (/ɪˈnoʊniː/; Ancient Greek: Οἰνώνη, romanized: Oinṓnē, lit. 'wine woman') was the first wife of Paris of Troy, whom he abandoned for Helen. Oenone was also the ancient name of an island, which was later named after Aegina, daughter of the river god Asopus.

== Biography ==
Oenone was a mountain nymph on Mount Ida in Phrygia, a mountain associated with the Mother Goddess Cybele and the Titaness Rhea. Her gift of prophecy was learned from Rhea. Her father was either the river-gods, Cebren or Oeneus. Her name links her to the gift of wine.

== Mythology ==
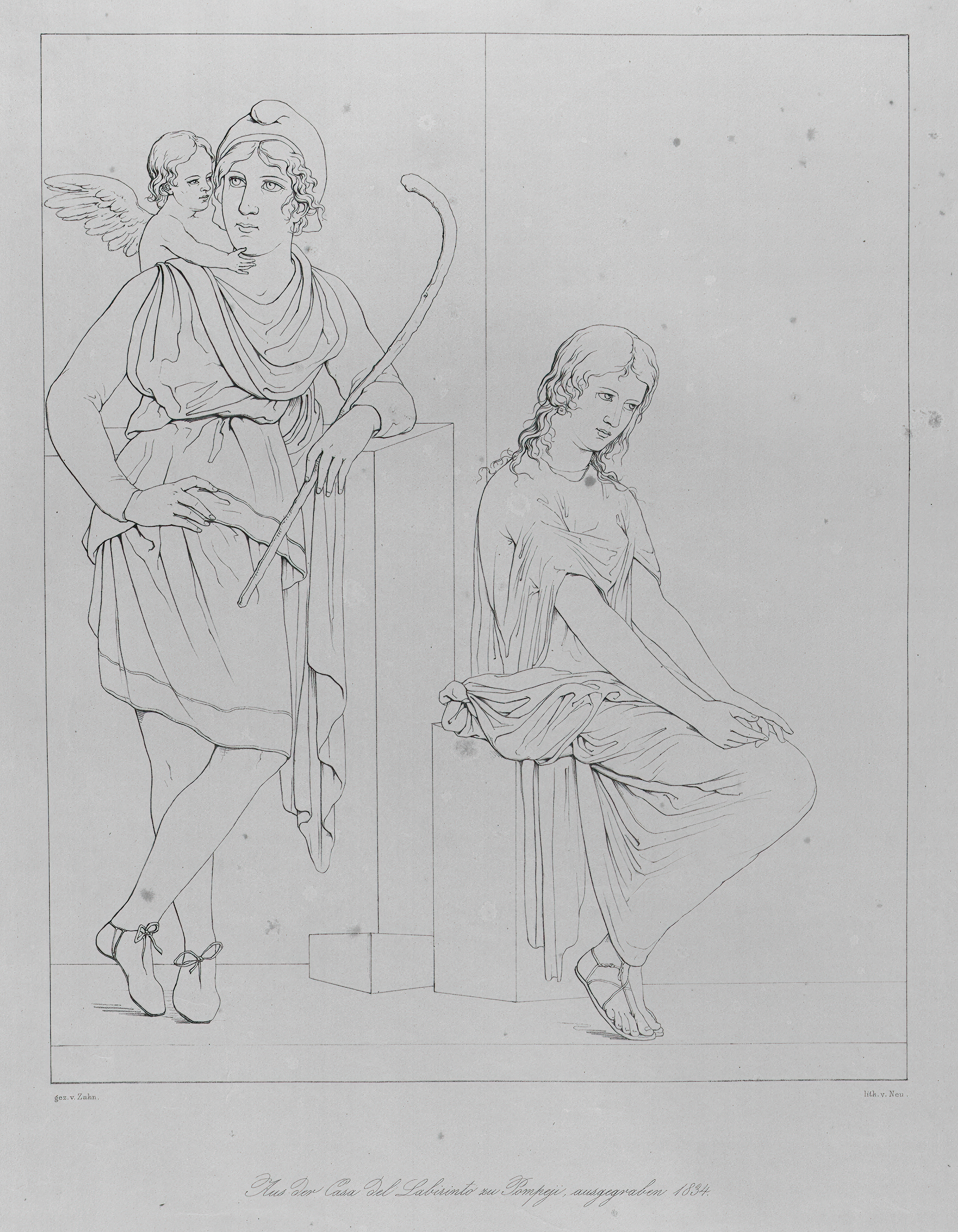
Drawing of a fresco depicting Paris, Eros, and Oenone from the House of the Labyrinth, Pompeii

Paris, son of king Priam and Hecuba, fell in love with Oenone when he was a shepherd on the slopes of Mount Ida. He had been exposed in infancy owing to a prophecy that he would bring destruction to Troy, but rescued by the herdsman Agelaus. The couple married, and Oenone gave birth to a son, Corythus. Paris swore he would never desert her, but Oenone prophesied that - whilst his love for her was true now - he would later abandon her and bring ruin to his family. Paris, perhaps disturbed or afraid, always dismissed her warnings. Upon realizing she could not persuade him to stay, Oenone told Paris to come to her if he was ever wounded.

Her prediction came true when Paris returned to his birth parents in Troy and sailed across the Aegean for Helen, the queen of Sparta. Out of revenge, she sent Corythus to guide the Greeks to Troy. Another version has it that she used him to drive a rift between Paris and Helen. Paris, not recognizing his own son, killed him.

She even sent her son to inform the Greeks of the prophecies required to take Troy: one of the Aeacidae, Pelops' bones, and Heracles' arrows.

One of the only extensive surviving narrations of Oenone and Paris is Quintus Smyrnaeus, Posthomerica, Book 10, 259–489, which tells the return of the dying Paris to Oenone. Mortally wounded by Philoctetes's arrow, he begged Oenone to heal him with her herbal arts, but she refused and cast him out with scorn, to return to Helen's bed, and Paris died on the lower slopes of Ida. Then, overcome with remorse, Oenone, the one whole-hearted mourner of Paris, threw herself onto his burning funeral pyre, which the shepherds had raised.

In Apollodorus' Library, she hanged herself upon finding Paris dead, whilst Lycophron imagines her throwing herself from the walls of Troy. According to Conon's Narrations, Oenone kills the messenger who informed her of Paris' demise.

In other versions, she is not involved in Paris' death. According to the Little Iliad and Dictys Cretensis, Paris is killed on the battlefield and his body recovered by the Trojans. Dictys adds Oenone was unable to speak upon seeing her former husband's corpse. She fell down dead, overwhelmed by grief.

In his commentary to Lycophron, Tzetzes mentions a version where Oenone wanted to help Paris but was stopped by her father. She later found him dead and killed herself.

Her tragic story makes one of the Love Romances of Parthenius of Nicaea, where she jests that Paris ask Helen to heal him. Even so, she sets out to save her husband, but arrives too late, and kills herself.

Ovid includes an imagined reproachful letter from Oenone to Paris in his Heroides, a text that has been extended by a number of spurious post-Ovidian interpolations, which include an elsewhere unattested rape of Oenone by Apollo.

== In literature ==
Thomas Heywood wrote the epyllion Oenone and Paris (1594) in rhyme royal.

Aphra Behn composed a paraphrase of the fifth book of Ovid's Heroides titled "Oenone to Paris", which was published in 1680 in John Dryden and Jacob Tonson's collection Ovid's Epistles Translated by Several Hands.

William Morris included "The Death of Paris" in The Earthly Paradise.

Lawrence Binyon published Paris and Oenone, a one-act closet tragedy in blank verse, in 1906.

Tennyson adapted the source material of Smyrnaeus for "The Death of Oenone" (1892), distilling its tragic essence. This was Tennyson's second poem on the subject; his previous attempt, "Oenone", was critically panned when first published in 1833. The poem was practically rewritten between then and 1842 and the revised version has been described as exquisitely beautiful.

In Racine's Phèdre, the name Oenone is given to Phaedra's nurse, a character who also commits suicide.
