= Salmydessus =

Ancient city of Thrace

Coordinates: 41°38′14″N 28°05′28″E

Salmydessus or Salmydessos (Ancient Greek: Σαλμυδησσός), also Halmydessus or Halmydissos (Ἁλμυδισσός), was a town on the Euxine Sea in ancient Thrace, about 97 kilometres (60 mi) northwest of the entrance of the Bosporus, near present day Kıyıköy in European Turkey. The eastern offshoots of the Haemus Mountains come very close to the shore here, which they divide from the valley of the Hebrus.

Little is known of the history of Salmydessus. Herodotus writes that "...before he [Darius the Great] came to the Ister, he first took the Getae, who pretend to be immortal. The Thracians of Salmydessus and of the country above the towns of Apollonia and Mesambria, who are called Cyrmianae and Nipsaei, surrendered without a fight to Darius; but the Getae resisted stubbornly, and were enslaved at once, the bravest and most just Thracians of all." During the reign of Seuthes II (c. 405 - 387 BCE) Xenophon and the remnants of his Ten Thousand took the town for the Thracian ruler. Xenophon writes that "...after subduing the country in this neighborhood," he and the remains of the Ten Thousand "set out upon their return." In the Dictionary of Greek and Roman Geography it is said that "...the earlier writers appear to speak of Salmydessus as a district only, but in later authors, as Apollodorus, Pliny, and Mela, it is mentioned as a town."

Xenophon describes the coast of the Euxine Sea along Salmydessus as having numerous shoals, making it a dangerous port for sailors. Strabo says Salmydessus is "a desert and stony beach, harborless and wide open to the north winds, and in length extends as far as the Cyaneae, a distance of about seven hundred stadia [110 km or 68 mi); and all who are cast ashore on this beach are plundered by the Astae, a Thracian tribe who are situated above it." Aeschylus says it is "[a] rugged jaw, evil host of mariners, step-mother of ships." Xenophon goes on to add that the Thracians "who dwell on this coast have boundary stones set up and each group of them plunder the ships that are wrecked within their own limits," an arrangement made because "in earlier days, before they fixed the boundaries, it was said that in the course of their plundering many of them used to be killed by one another."
