= Arcadia (mythology) =

In Greek mythology, Arcadia (Ancient Greek: Ἀρκαδία) may refer to the following personages:

- Arcadia or Arcania, was one of the Danaides, daughters of King Danaos of Libya and later of Argos. She married and killed her groom, Xanthus, son of Aegyptus, king of Egypt.
- Arcadia, wife of Nyctimus, son of the impious Lycaon, and became the mother of a daughter Phylonome who consorted with Ares.
