= Paris (mythology) =

Trojan prince, second husband of Helen of Troy

- Prince of Troy
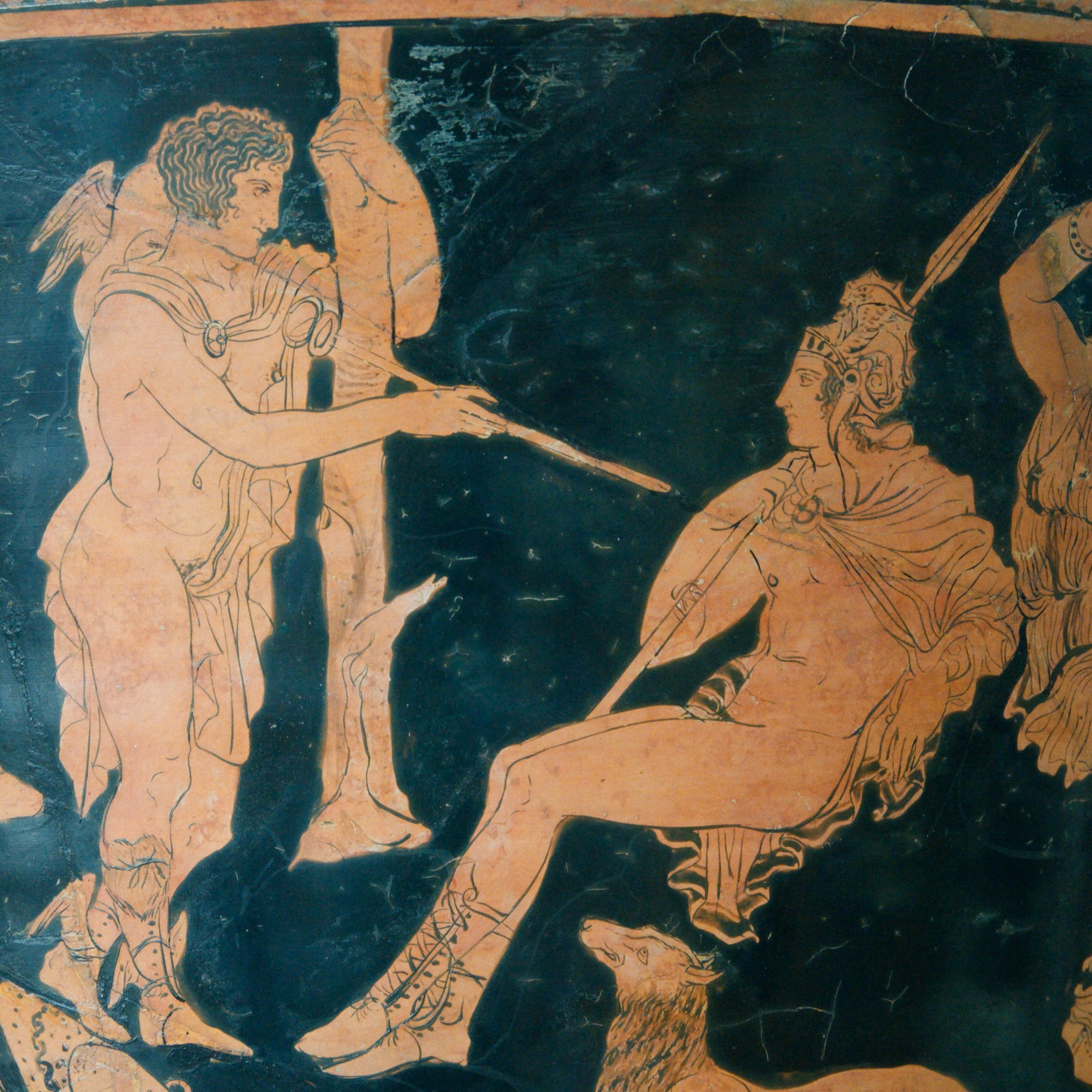
- Paris being asked by Hermes to arbitrate the contest on a Lucanian red-figured calyx-krater, c. 380 BC, in the Musée de la BnF
- Region: Troy

Genealogy
- Parents: Priam (father); Hecuba (mother)
- Spouse: Oenone, Helen
- Children: Corythus, Aganus, Bunomus, Idaeus, Helen

Paris (Ancient Greek: Πάρις, romanized: Páris), also known as Alexander (Ancient Greek: Ἀλέξανδρος, romanized: Aléxandros), is a figure from Greek mythology who appears in the numerous stories about the Trojan War, including the Iliad. He was prince of Troy, a son of King Priam and Queen Hecuba, and younger brother of Prince Hector. His elopement with the Spartan queen Helen sparks the Trojan War, during which he fatally wounds Achilles.

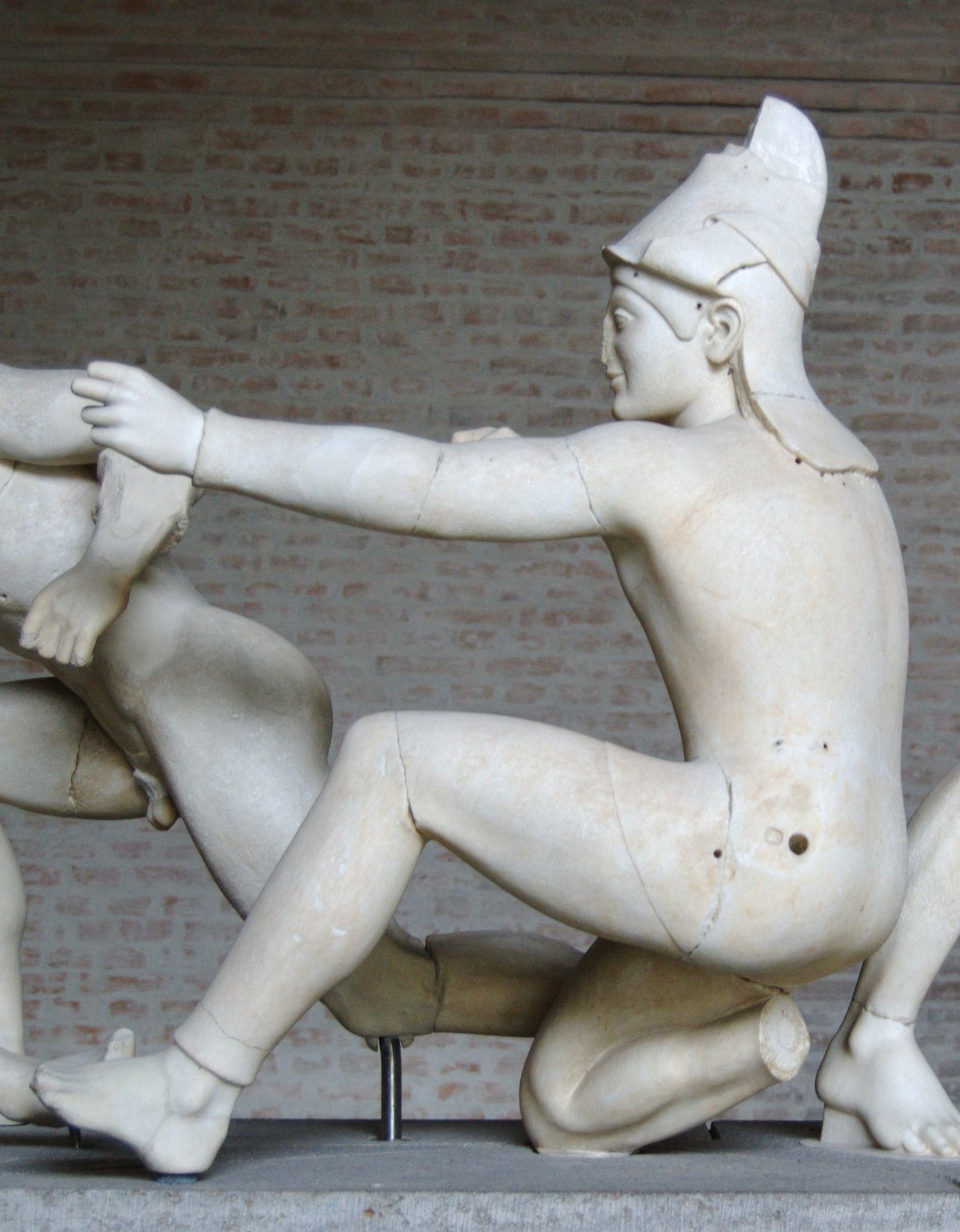
So called The 'Trojan Archer' or 'Paris', from the west pediment of the Temple of Aphaia, ca. 505–500 BC, Munich.

== Name ==
The Ancient Greek name Πάρις is probably of Luwian origin, and is comparable to Parizitis, attested as a Hittite scribe's name, explained as compound of Luwian 𒉺𒊑 (pari "foremost") and 𒍣𒋾𒅖 (zitis "man"), so "foremost, primary man".

He is also referred to as "Alexandros", which is the more common name for him in Homeric epic. According to mythical tradition, he received this name (which means 'the Protector' or 'the Protected') because he was able to survive being abandoned in the wilderness as an infant. The name has been noted for its similarity to Alaksandu, a king of the Late Bronze Age city of Wilusa, which has been identified with the archaeological site of Troy.

Ludolf Malten had proposed that the name Paris is actually related to Parium, originally meaning the eponym founder of the polis. Leo Klejn considered the name a relatively late addition to the tradition, pointing out that it is never used with the constant epithets typical for the oral epic song. He believed that the name Alexander was the original name at the time when abducting a woman was considered heroic, and started being replaced (along with Alexander's depiction as a great hero, still surviving in a number of places in the Iliad) when the morals changed against that view.

The name "Paris" is etymologically unrelated to that of France's capital city, derived from the Gallic Parisii tribe, although it had been a misconceived folk etymology during the medieval period.

== Description ==
In Book 3 of Homer's Iliad, Paris is described as "godlike" (θεοειδής in Ancient Greek) in outward cosmetic beauty. He was generally regarded by ancient authors as feminine. Euripides' plays describe him as "handsome beyond all other men," "with flowery clothing and bright gold, barbarian opulence."

Philostratus wrote that he did not allow dirt to settle on his hair, even in the midst of battle. He had an aquiline nose, polished his nails, and had his eyes painted. He had long hair, in contrast with his brother Hector who cut his own short. According to Philostratus, Paris was eighteen years old when he travelled to Sparta.

Paris was described by the chronicler Malalas as "well-grown, sturdy, white, good nose, good eyes, black pupils, black hair, incipient beard, long-faced, heavy eyebrows, big mouth, charming, eloquent, agile, an accurate archer, cowardly, hedonist." Meanwhile, in the account of Dares the Phrygian, he was illustrated as "fair, tall, and brave. His eyes were very beautiful, his hair soft and blond, his mouth charming, and his voice pleasant. He was swift, and eager to take command." Tzetzes adds he had a "very cheerful demeanor and gentle smile," and that he was "concise yet eloquent" with "thick and delicate" hair.

== Children ==
In a tale from the 1st-century BC writer Parthenius, a love affair between Paris and a nymph, Oenone, resulted in a son named Corythus. Parthenius relates that in another version Corythus was the child of Paris and Helen, and a scholium on the Odyssey mentions that the couple were said to have a son named either Corythus or Helenus.

According to the chronicle of the Trojan War attributed to Dictys Cretensis, Paris had three sons with Helen: Bunomus, Corythus, and Idaeus. According to the Cypria, the pair had another called Aganus. This child was taken by his parents to Cyprus with his half-brother Pleisthenes, son of Menelaus. Jonathan Burgess suggests they formed a heroic genealogy for Cypriots.

Ptolemy Chennus mentions he had a daughter with Helen, whom he wanted to name Alexandra. After winning a game of knucklebones against him, Helen named the child after herself. This younger Helen was killed by Hecuba during the fall of Troy.

== Mythology ==
=== Childhood ===
Paris herding cattle. Etruscan black figure neck-amphora, 550-530 BC.

==== Exposure ====
Paris was a child of Priam, the king of Troy, by his wife Hecuba. Just before his birth, his mother dreamed that she gave birth to a flaming torch. This dream was interpreted by the seer Aesacus as a foretelling of the downfall of Troy, and he declared that the child would be the ruin of his homeland. On the day of Paris's birth, it was further announced by Aesacus that the child born of a royal Trojan that day would have to be killed to spare the kingdom, being the child that would bring about the prophecy. Though Paris was indeed born before nightfall, he was spared by Priam. Hecuba was also unable to kill the child, despite the urging of the priestess of Apollo, one Herophile. Instead, Paris's father prevailed upon his chief herdsman, Agelaus, to remove the child and kill him. The herdsman, unable to use a weapon against the infant, left him exposed on Mount Ida, hoping he would perish there (cf. Oedipus). He was, however, suckled by a she-bear. Returning after nine days, Agelaus was astonished to find the child still alive and brought him home in a backpack (Greek pḗra, hence by folk etymology Paris's name) to rear as his own. He returned to Priam bearing a dog's tongue as evidence of the deed's completion.

==== On Mount Ida ====
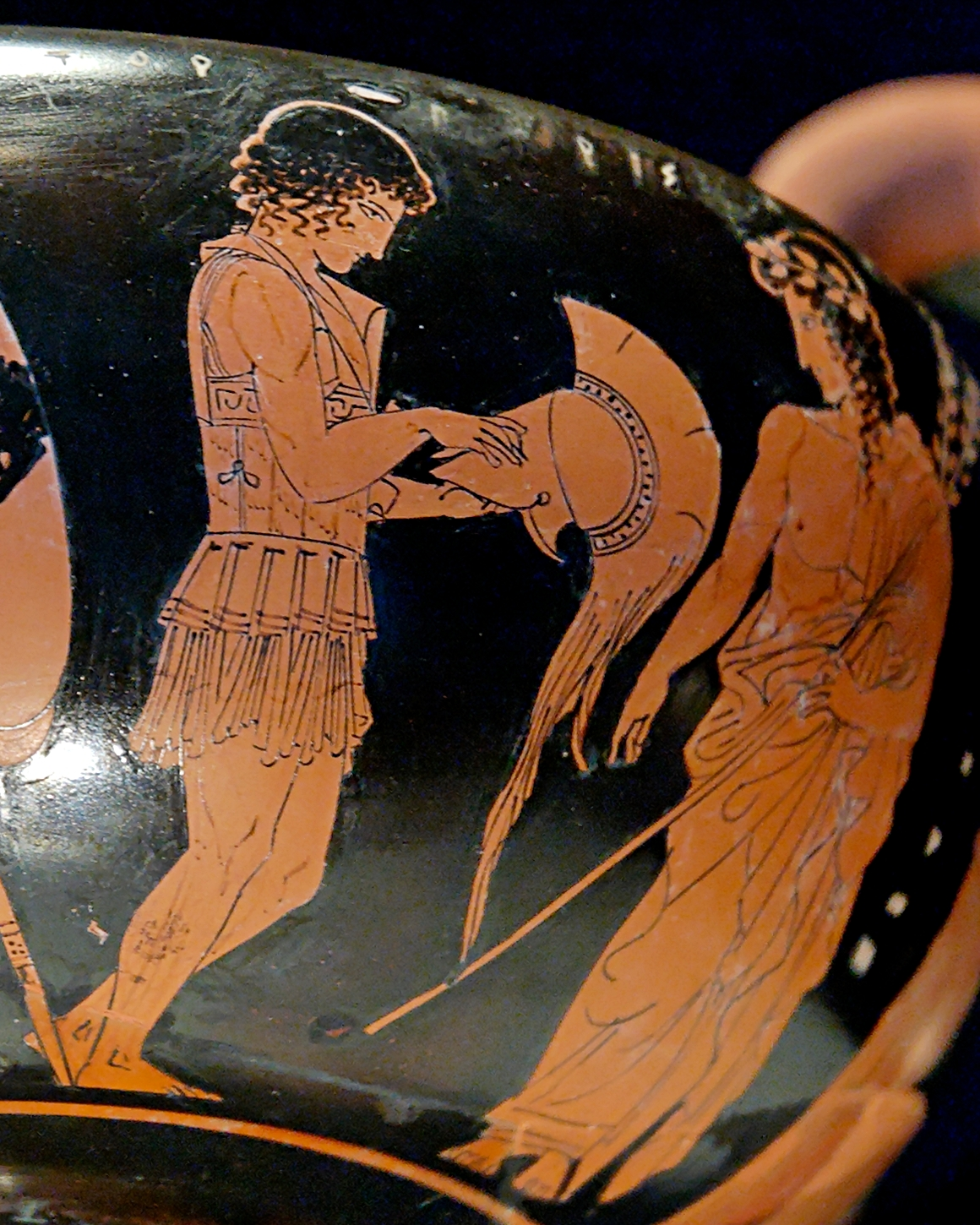
Paris armoring himself with Apollo. Attic red-figure kantharos, 425-420 BC.

Paris's noble birth was betrayed by his outstanding beauty and intelligence. In one account of his childhood, he routed a gang of cattle-thieves and restored the animals they had stolen to the herd. According to one Sostratus, Paris was a lover of Apollo. The god taught him archery and gave him an ivory bow. While on Mount Ida in Phrygia, Paris became enamoured with the nymph Oenone, a daughter of the river god Cebren. She was skilled in the arts of prophecy and medicine, which she had been taught by Rhea and Apollo, respectively. Through her ability to see the future, she foresaw Paris leaving her but loved him deeply even so. When Paris later left her for Helen, she told him that if he ever was wounded, he should come to her, for she could heal any injury, even the most serious wounds.

Paris's chief distraction at this time was to pit Agelaus's bulls against one another. One bull began to win these bouts consistently. Paris began to set it against rival herdsmen's own prize bulls and it defeated them all. Finally, Paris offered a golden crown to any bull that could defeat his champion. Ares responded to this challenge by transforming himself into a bull and easily winning the contest. Paris gave the crown to Ares without hesitation. It was this apparent honesty in judgement that prompted the gods of Olympus to have Paris arbitrate the divine contest among Hera, Aphrodite, and Athena.

==== Recognition ====
Priam and Hecuba established annual funeral games in honour of their presumed-dead son. When Paris reached young manhood, men from the palace took his favourite bull as prize for the competition. He followed them to Troy, deciding to compete for the animal. Paris won every challenge, defeating even the nobles. Prince Deiphobus, embarrassed from losing to a slave, attempted to kill his long lost brother. Paris took refuge at an altar and was there saved by the prophet Cassandra revealing his true heritage. He was welcomed back as a prince. Soon after, he left for Sparta.

This story would form the basis for plays by Sophocles, Ennius and Euripides, all titled Alexander.

Paris fleeing from Deiphobus and his family. Etruscan funerary urn, Volterra, c. 150-100 BC.

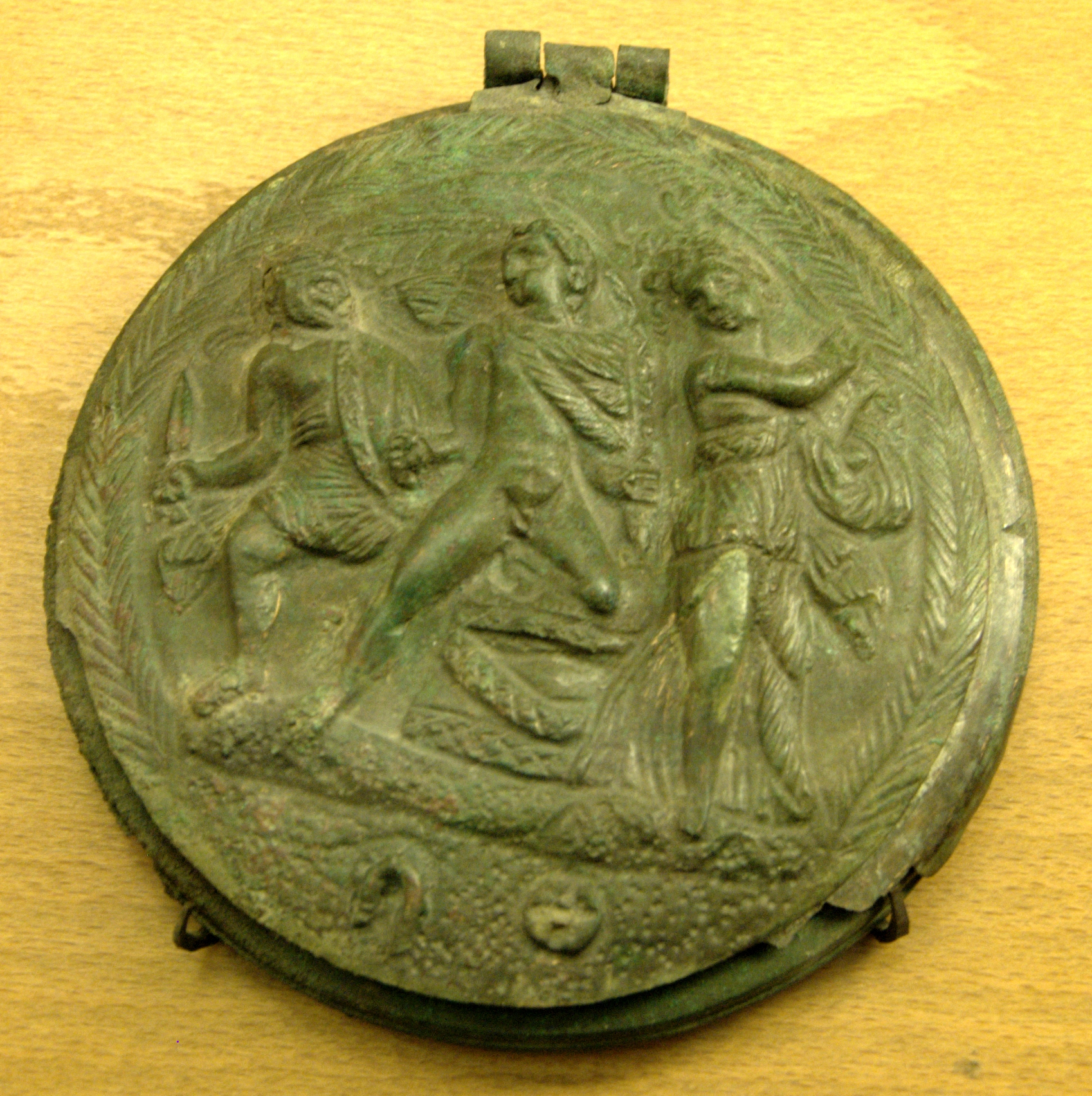
Paris taking refuge on an altar, attacked by Hector and Cassandra. Etruscan bronze mirror, 3rd century BC.

Paris attacked by Deiphobus, the palm branch representing his victory on the ground. Etruscan funerary urn, 3rd century BC.

==== Alternative stories ====
Byzantine authors offer different versions of Paris's childhood story.

According to John Malalas, when Paris was born, Priam consulted the oracle of Apollo. The oracle warned that the child would destroy the Phrygian kingdoms when he reached the age of thirty. Fearing the prophecy, Priam renamed the boy Alexander and secretly sent him to the countryside to be raised by a farmer. To keep him hidden, Priam also built a strong fortified settlement in the countryside, naming it Parion. Paris grew up there and received his education. After thirty-two years had passed, Priam believed the prophecy had expired. He brought Paris back to Troy with great honor and later sent him on a religious mission to Greece to offer sacrifices to Apollo.

John Tzetzes offers a similar account. He writes that Hecuba, early in her pregnancy, dreamed she was giving birth to a fiery beast that would destroy Troy. Prophets interpreted her dreams and warned that her unborn child, Paris, would bring disaster to the city. Despite this, Hecuba gave birth, and Priam, fearing for the kingdom, consulted the oracle of Apollo. The oracle confirmed that Paris would cause Troy's destruction upon reaching the age of thirty. Priam then sent Paris to grow up in the countryside, in a city he built called Parion. There, Paris received his education and training. After thirty years, Priam brought Paris back to Troy and later sent him to Argos to offer sacrifices to Apollo to avert disaster.

The Suda provides a slightly different detail, stating that the place was called Amandros, where Paris spent thirty years growing up and receiving his education. Later, the city was renamed Parion after him.

An alternative version recorded by the Late Antique poet Dracontius in his De Raptu Helenae removes all elements of divine intervention and the classic Judgment of Paris. In this account, Paris sets sail on a mission to reclaim his aunt Hesione but is thrown off course by a severe storm, causing him to accidentally shipwreck in Cyprus. Meanwhile, Helen has traveled to Cyprus in Menelaus's absence to celebrate a festival of Venus (Aphrodite). The two meet at the festival, quickly fall in lighthearted romance, and resolve to run away together. Their elopement provokes a chase by a local mob of angry islanders and Menelaus on horseback before they successfully escape back to Phrygia to celebrate their nuptials.

The Athenian playwright Cratinus wrote a comedy, Dionysalexandros, where the god Dionysus took Paris' place in his judgement of the goddesses. Dionysus steals Helen away to Mount Ida where they are found by Paris. He intends to hand them both over to the Greeks, before Helen refuses to leave. Taking pity, he marries her, handing over Dionysus.

=== Judgement of Paris ===
In celebration of the marriage of Peleus and Thetis, Lord Zeus, ruler and a chief deity of the Greek pantheon, hosted a banquet on Mount Olympus. Alongside the birth of Helen, this union was part of his plan to incite war after Gaia had asked him to depopulate humankind. Every deity and demi-god had been invited, except Eris, the goddess of strife (no one wanted a troublemaker at a wedding). For revenge, Eris threw the golden Apple of Discord inscribed with "For the most beautiful" (Ancient Greek: τῇ καλλίστῃ, romanized: tē(i) kallistē(i)) into the party, provoking a squabble among the attendant goddesses over whom it had been meant for.

The goddesses thought to be the most beautiful were Hera, Athena, and Aphrodite, and each one claimed the apple. They started a quarrel so they asked Zeus to choose one of them. Knowing that choosing any of them would bring him the hatred of the other two, Zeus did not want to take part in the decision. He thus appointed Paris to select the most beautiful.

Escorted by Hermes, the three goddesses bathed in the spring of Mount Ida and approached Paris as he herded his cattle. Paris was frightened at the appearance of the deities, but Hermes assured him it was the will of Zeus. Some artistic depictions have the goddesses appear unclad before the mortal. Still, Paris could not decide, as all three were ideally beautiful, so the goddesses attempted to bribe him to choose among them. Hera offered ownership of all of Europe and Asia. Athena offered skill in battle, wisdom and the abilities of the greatest warriors. Aphrodite offered the love of the most beautiful woman on Earth: Helen of Sparta. Paris chose Helen and thereby Aphrodite. However, Helen was already married to King Menelaus of Sparta.

==== Elopement with Helen ====
While minor traditions have that Paris raided Sparta and stole Helen by force, most ancient sources claim that when Menelaus was away from home, Helen fell in love with Paris and left with him of her own free will. In the Iliad, Helen notes how she had followed Paris to Troy, and she is also referred in the text as his legitimate wife, equal to him in status, rather than his slave or kidnapped bride. Helen was also willing participant of elopement according to Hesiod, Alcaeus, and Sappho, as well as Cypria. Apollodorus describes the pair taking Spartan valuables together.

The Spartans' expedition to retrieve Helen from Paris in Troy is the mythological basis of the Trojan War. This triggered the war because Helen was famous for her beauty throughout Achaea (ancient Greece), and had many suitors of extraordinary ability. Therefore, following Odysseus's advice, her father Tyndareus made all suitors promise to defend Helen's marriage to the man he chose for her. When Paris took her to Troy, Menelaus invoked this oath. Helen's other suitors, who between them represented most of Achaea's strength, wealth, and military prowess, were obliged to help bring her back. Thus, the whole of Greece moved against Troy in force and the Trojan War began.

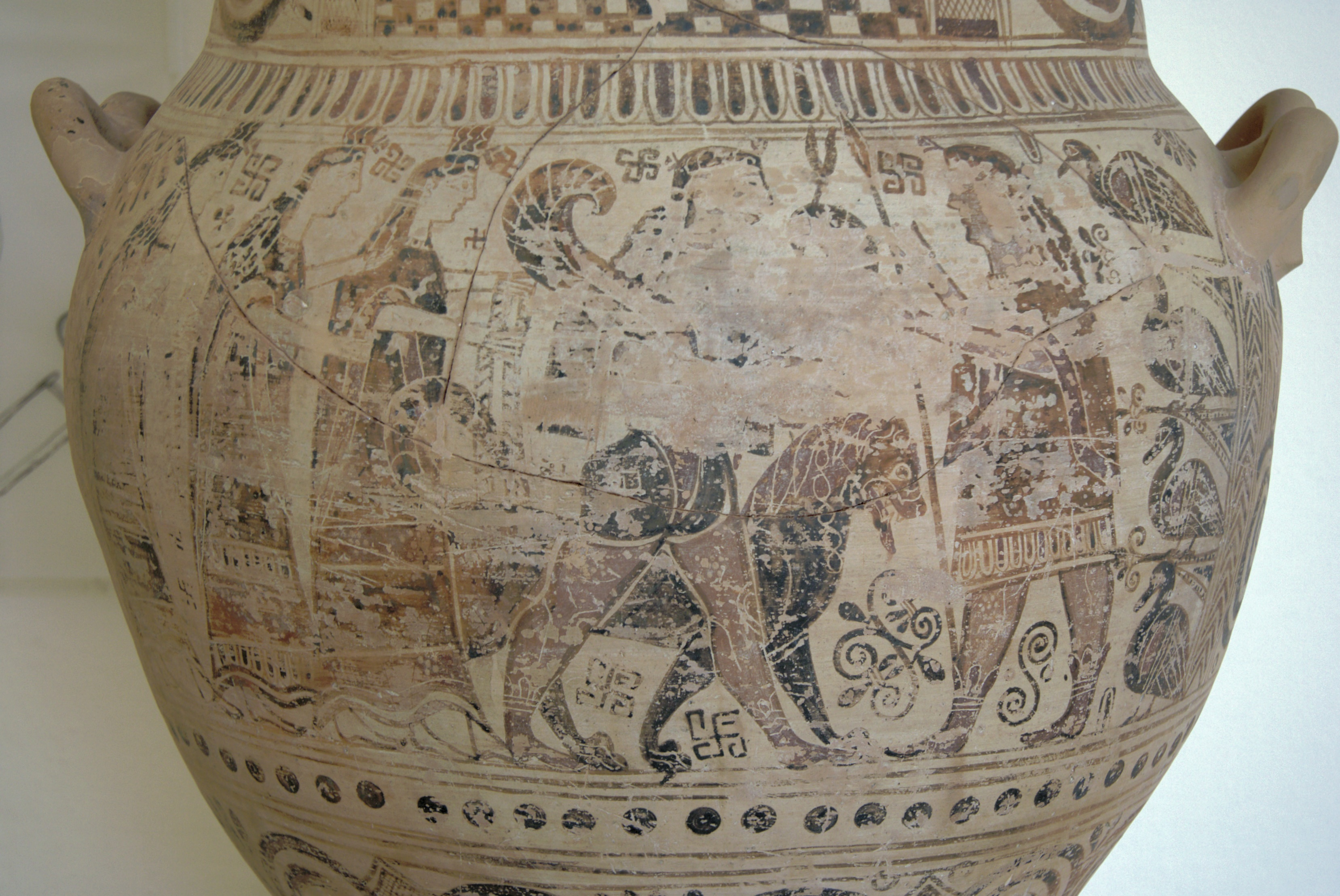
7th-century BC Melian pithamphora depicting the Judgement of Paris, Archaeological Museum of Paros.

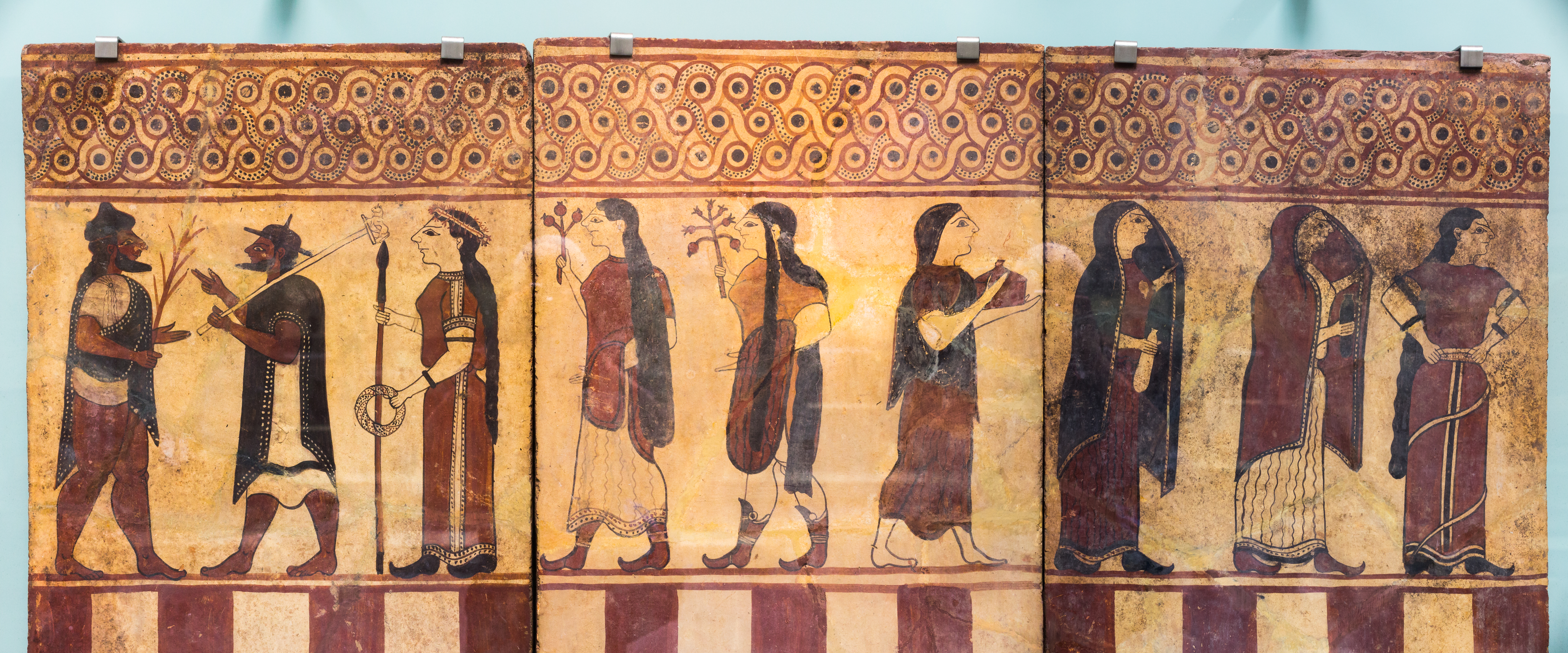
Paris receives Hermes who leads Athena, Hera and Aphrodite. Painting on terracotta panels, 560–550 BC

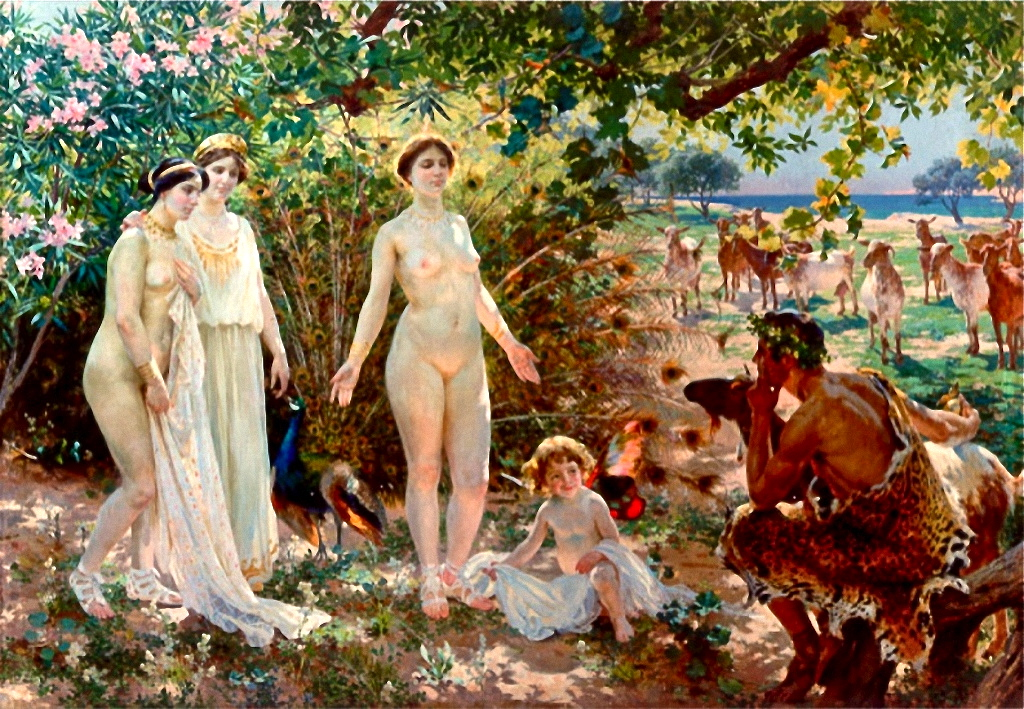
El Juicio de Paris by Enrique Simonet, c. 1904. Paris is studying Aphrodite, who is standing before him naked. The other two goddesses watch nearby.

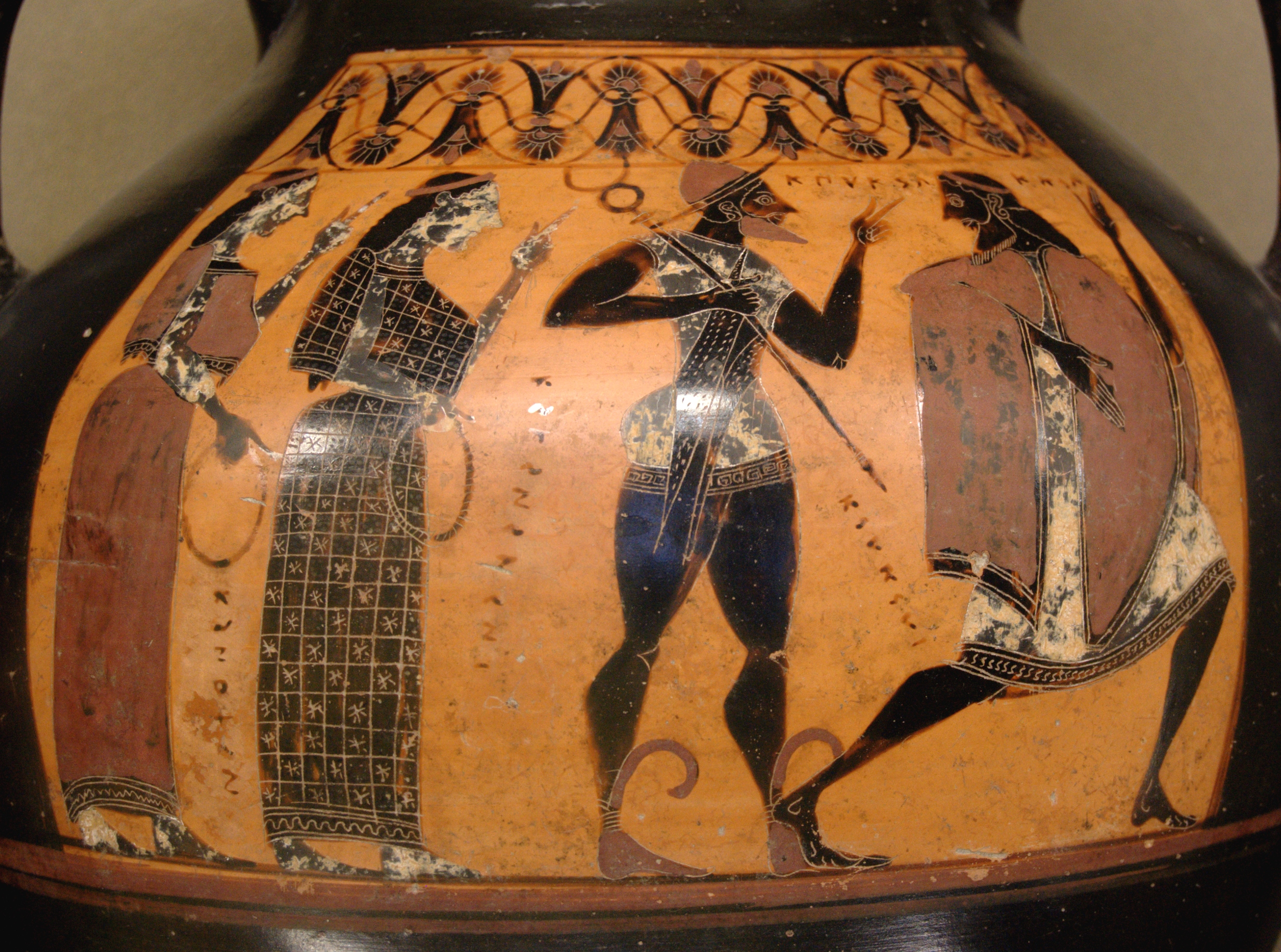
Paris fleeing from Hermes and the goddesses. Attic black-figure amphora, 560–550 BC

Judgement of Paris. Etruscan bronze mirror, 400–200 BC

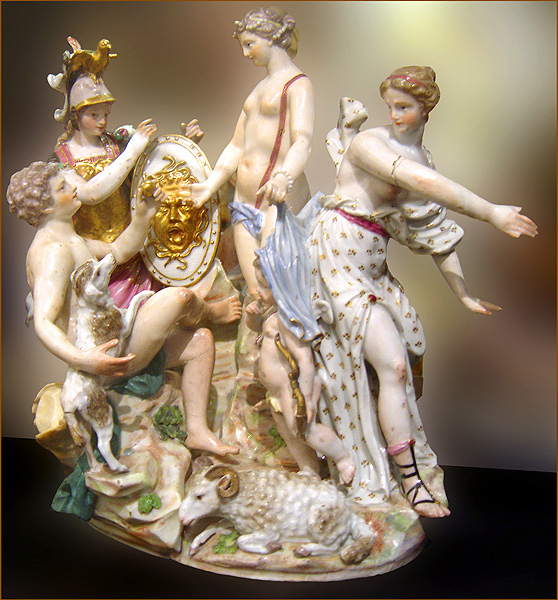
Judgement of Paris, c. 1801, Capodimonte porcelain (Capitoline Museums, Rome)

=== Trojan War ===
The Iliad portrays Paris as ambivalent. In Book 3, he proclaims that he will duel any of the Greeks, only to flee once Menelaus steps up. After being reproached by his brother Hector, he consents to the duel. When in this duel it seems his defeat it imminent, Aphrodite whisks Paris away, taking him to his chamber where she ensures that Helen sleeps with him. Book 3 contrasts Paris with Menelaus, Helen's previous husband, by juxtaposing the former's effeminate nature with the latter's animalistic masculinity.

The poem depicts him as a lesser warrior than Hector, who rebukes him multiple times, calling him pretty and unwarlike. Christopher Ransom claims that Paris functions as a foil to establish the idealised framework of heroic virtue, contrasting Paris's physical indulgence with Hector's civic duty. Paris also fights using a bow, a weapon that was generally seen as unmanly. He does, however, successfully wound several Greeks over the course of the poem, including Diomedes, Machaon, and Eurypylus.

In Book 6 Hector is appalled to find that Paris is still at home alongside Helen while the war rages outside. He criticises him for remaining inside while the army bleeds for him, demanding that he get up immediately. Helen is apologetic, expressing self loathing and shame at Paris' behaviour, openly mocking Paris' lack of moral character and courage, and wishing that if the gods had to curse her as they did, they could have at least paired her with a better man. Hector tells her that he cannot stay, and asks Helen to make sure that Paris gets moving so that they can return to the fight together. He bids farewell to his wife Andromache, then finally Paris catches up to him, making a lighthearted joke about keeping him waiting, and Hector laments that Paris would have the strength and skill of a warrior, but lacks the courage and commitment to use them as would be expected of him. He tells Paris that the Trojans speak of him in utter disgrace, and wishes Paris would get his act together and remove the disgrace his actions have brought upon himself and Troy.

In Book 11, Paris wounds Diomedes from afar, with an arrow through the foot. In response to his unseemly crowing, Diomedes disparages him in multiple ways: "Archer, you who without your bow are nothing, slanderer and seducer!" In Book 13, Paris calls on the fighting Trojans to press the attack against the Greeks.

Hector and Achilles engage in a duel in Book 22, with the Greek hero emerging victorious. Immediately before his death, Hector prophesies that Achilles will meet his own demise at the hands of Paris and the god Apollo. In the Aethiopis, a lost epic that chronologically followed the Iliad, Achilles's death at the hands of Paris and Apollo was described. In the poem, he was probably killed by an arrow that was shot at his heel, the only part of his body susceptible to injury. According to a version in the Fabulae, a 2nd-century AD mythological handbook, Apollo kills him while disguised as Paris.

The Little Iliad and Sophocles's Philoctetes relate that Paris is killed during a duel with the archer Philoctetes. His body is fought over and recovered by Trojan soldiers.

In later versions, Paris doesn't die immediately, but after Philoctetes mortally wounds him, he goes to Mount Ida or is transported there by servants and attendants. There, either he or those accompanying him ask Paris' first wife, the nymph Oenone, to heal him, which she refuses.

Depending on the account, Paris either dies on the mountainside, or is brought back to Troy where he dies the same day. When Oenone hears of his death she commits suicide, either by leaping from heights, hanging herself or jumping on Paris' funeral pyre. Yet another version has Oenone eager to heal Paris, but was prevented by her father from doing so.

In the account of Dares Phrygius, Paris fatally wounds Ajax the Greater with an arrow, but Ajax hunts him down and kills Paris before dropping dead.

After Paris's death, his brothers Deiphobus and Helenus competed for the hand in marriage of Helen, with Deiphobus winning out. Deiphobus was later killed by Menelaus during the sack of Troy.

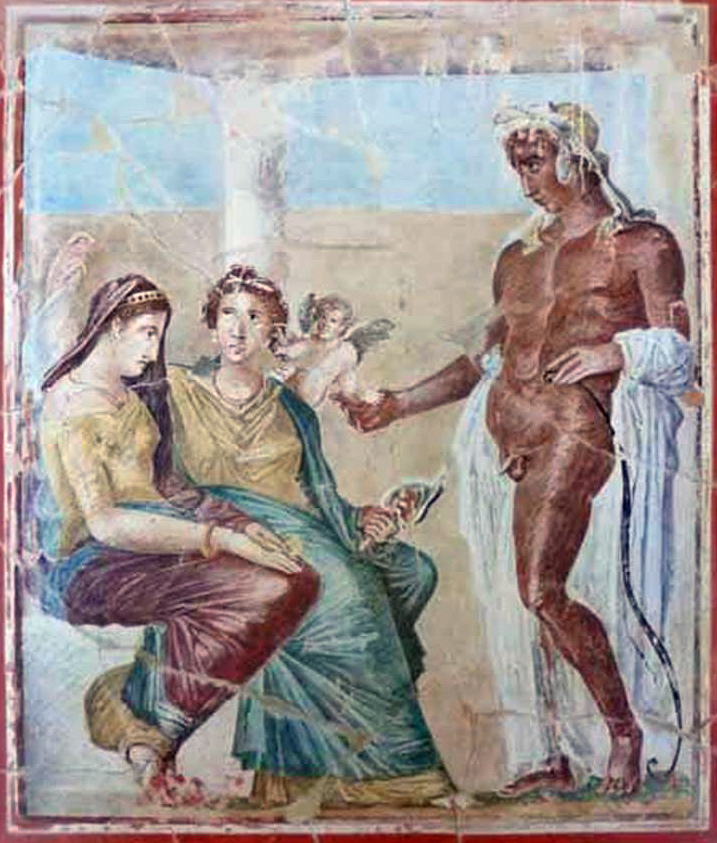
Seduction of Helen by Paris, antique fresco in Pompeii, 1st century

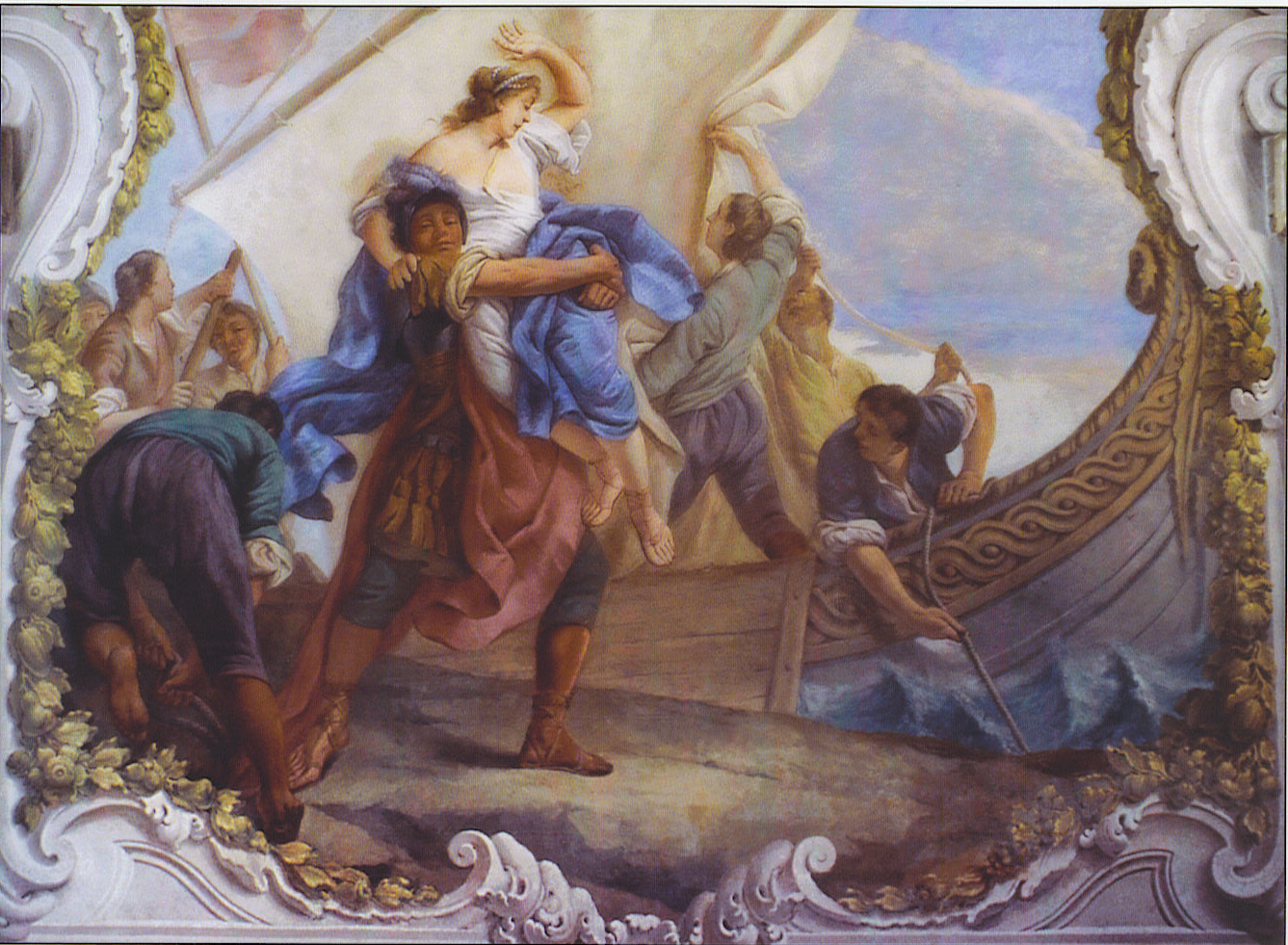
Abduction of Helen, ceiling fresco, Venetian, mid-18th century

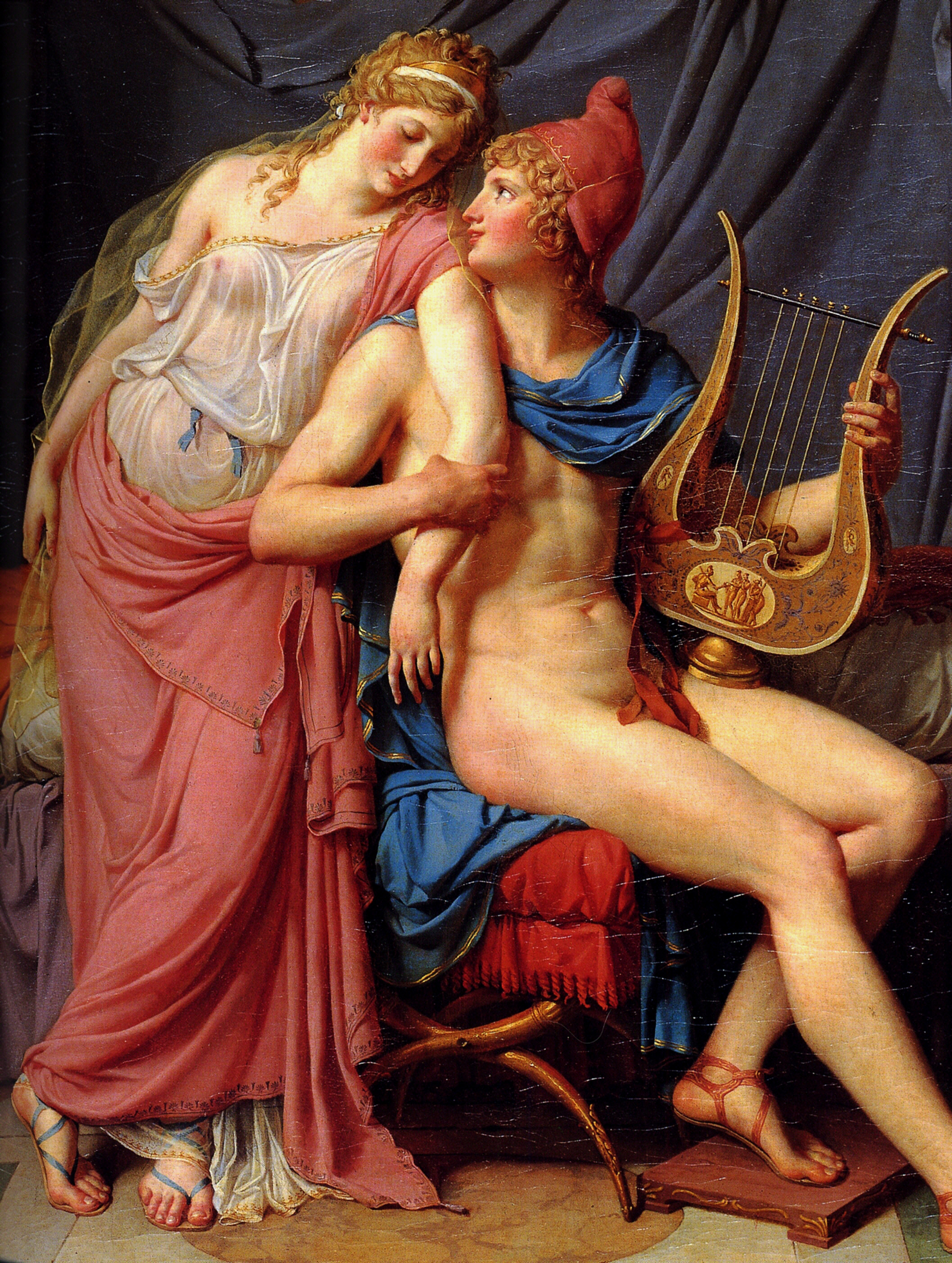
The Love of Helen and Paris by Jacques-Louis David (oil on canvas, 1788, Louvre, Paris)

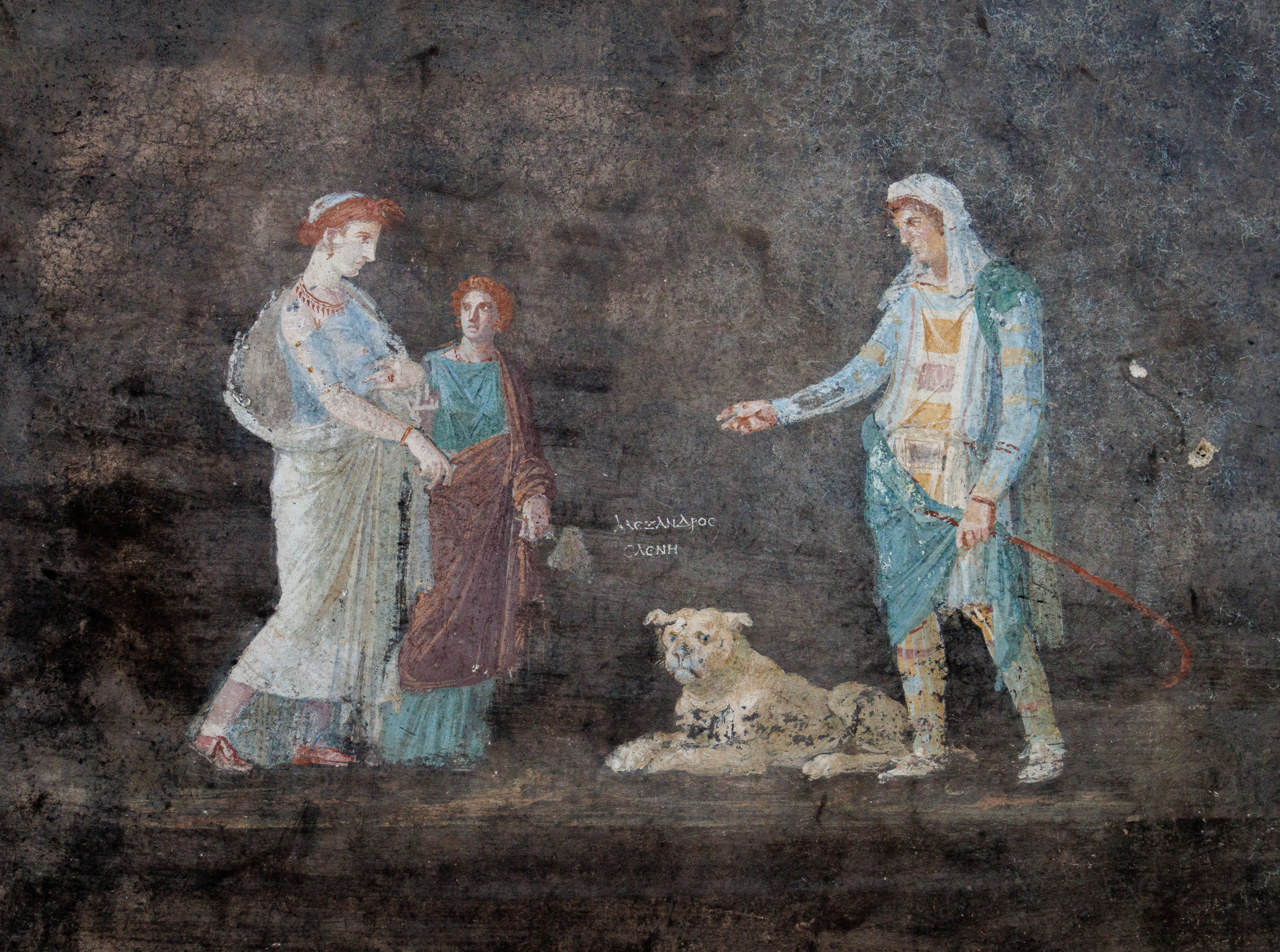
Antique fresco from Pompeii, showing Trojan prince Paris with Helen of Troy (1st century CE)

== Later treatments ==
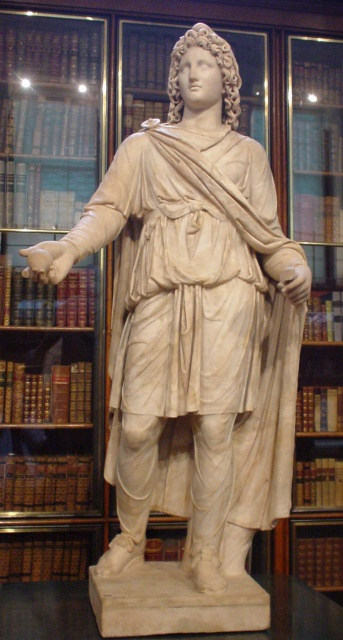
Paris, in "Phrygian dress", a second-century CE Roman marble (The King's Library, British Museum)

- In Dante's Inferno, Paris is one of the sinners punished for lust alongside Helen in the second circle.
- Jacques Offenbach, Henri Meilhac and Ludovic Halévy's 1864 operetta La belle Hélène tells a droll version of the seduction of Helen by Paris, who is the lead male role.
- In the 1956 film Helen of Troy, Paris, as the main character, is portrayed as a heroic character who at first worships peace and love but is later forced to take up arms against the treacherous Greeks.
- The Judgement of Paris and its aftermath are the subject of Michael Tippett's 1962 opera King Priam.
- The story was also made into a 2003 musical, Paris, written by Jon English and David Mackay. A concept album was released in 1990.
- In the 2004 Hollywood film Troy, the character Paris was played by actor Orlando Bloom. He is not killed by Philoctetes in this version, but leaves the falling city of Troy together with Helen and survives. Paris is portrayed as an irresponsible prince who put his romance before his family and country.

== See also ==
- List of children of Priam
- Alaksandu of Wilusa, a 13th-century BC Anatolian king who has been associated with Paris

== General references ==
- Bernabé, Alberto, Poetarum Epicorum Graecorum Testimonia et Fragmenta. Pars I, Bibliotheca Teubneriana, Stuttgart and Leipzig, B. G. Teubner, 1996. ISBN 3815417066. doi:10.1515/9783110936995.
- Brown, Andrew, "Paris", in Oxford Classical Dictionary, edited by Tim Whitmarsh, New York, Oxford University Press, 2016. ISBN 9780199381135.
- Gantz, Timothy, Early Greek Myth: A Guide to Literary and Artistic Sources, Baltimore, Johns Hopkins University Press, 1993. ISBN 080184410X.
- Grimal, Pierre, The Dictionary of Classical Mythology, Malden, Oxford, and Carlton, Blackwell Publishing, 1986. ISBN 0631201025. Internet Archive.
- Homer, The Iliad with an English Translation by A.T. Murray, Ph.D. in two volumes. Cambridge, MA., Harvard University Press; London, William Heinemann, Ltd. 1924. Online version at the Perseus Digital xLibrary.
- Homer, Homeri Opera in five volumes. Oxford, Oxford University Press. 1920. Greek text available at the Perseus Digital Library.
- Lattimore, Richmond, The Iliad of Homer, Chicago and London, University of Chicago Press, 1951. ISBN 0-226-46940-9. Internet Archive.
- Parthenius, Love Romances translated by Sir Stephen Gaselee (1882-1943), S. Loeb Classical Library Volume 69. Cambridge, MA. Harvard University Press. 1916. Online version at the Topos Text Project.
- Parthenius, Erotici Scriptores Graeci, Vol. 1. Rudolf Hercher. in aedibus B. G. Teubneri. Leipzig. 1858. Greek text available at the Perseus Digital Library.
- Quintus Smyrnaeus, The Fall of Troy translated by Way. A. S. Loeb Classical Library Volume 19. London: William Heinemann, 1913. Online version at theoi.com
- Quintus Smyrnaeus, The Fall of Troy. Arthur S. Way. London: William Heinemann; New York: G.P. Putnam's Sons. 1913. Greek text available at the Perseus Digital Library.
- Ransom, Christopher, "Aspects of Effeminacy and Masculinity in the Iliad", in Antichthon, Vol. 45, pp. 35–57, 2011. doi:10.1017/S0066477400000046.
- Stoevesandt, Magdalene, "Paris", in Brill's New Pauly: Encyclopaedia of the Ancient World. Antiquity, Volume 10, Obl – Phe, edited by Hubert Cancik and Helmuth Schneider, Leiden, Brill, 2007. ISBN 9789004142152.
- Tsagalis, Christos, Early Greek Epic: Language, Interpretation, Performance, edited by Franco Montanari and Antonios Rengakos, Berlin and Boston, De Gruyter, 2023. ISBN 9783110993721. doi:10.1515/9783110981384.
- West, M. L. (2003), Homeric Hymns. Homeric Apocrypha. Lives of Homer, Loeb Classical Library No. 496, Cambridge, Massachusetts, Harvard University Press, 2003. ISBN 978-0-674-99606-9. Loeb Classical Library.
- West, M. L. (2006), Homerus: Ilias, Volumen I Rhapsodiae I–XII, Bibliotheca Teubneriana, Munich and Leipzig, K. G. Saur Verlag, 2006. ISBN 978-3-598-71430-6. doi:10.1515/9783110952971.
