= Idaea (wife of Phineus) =

Greek mythological figure

In Greek mythology, Idaea (/aɪˈdiːə/; Ancient Greek: Ἰδαία, romanized: Idaía, lit. 'she who comes from/lives in Mount Ida') the second wife of Phineus, the king of Thrace, whose false accusations against her stepsons were responsible for her husband's misfortunes. She was sent back to her father the Scythian king Dardanus who condemned her to death. Other ancient sources give other names for Phineus' second wife, including: Eidothea, sister of Cadmus, and Eurytia.

== Mythology ==
Phineas was the blind seer, plagued by the Harpies, who was encountered by Jason and the Argonauts when they landed in Thrace. There were many different versions of how Phineus came to be blind. One version involved the mistreatment of his sons, by their stepmother Idaea. According to this version, Phineus' first wife was Cleopatra the daughter of Boreas, god of the North wind. Phineus had two sons by Cleopatra (variously named), who were falsely accused by Phineus' second wife Idaea, causing Phineus to (or allow Idaea to) blind, or imprison and torture, or kill his sons. In punishment for this crime against his sons, Phineus was himself blinded.

== Sources ==
Phineus' second wife is first encountered in the works of the fifth-century BC Greek poet Sophocles. His Antigone, has a passing reference to the story, saying simply that Phineus' sons, by his first wife, a daughter of Boreas, were stabbed in the eyes with a shuttle, by their stepmother (not named). However a scholiast on Apollonius of Rhodes' Argonautica says that, in a (now lost) Sophoclean play, the stepmother was named Idaea, and Phineus himself blinded his sons as a result of Idaea's slander. A scholiast on Antigone mentions versions of the story (perhaps Sophoclean) where the stepmother blinds the sons (as in Antigone) and imprisons the sons in a tomb, or accused the sons of rape (and so they are blinded by Phineus as in the scholion to Argonautica).

A scholiast to Homer, Odyssey 12.69, says that according to the Hellenistic mythographer Asclepiades (12F31), Phineus handed his sons over to their stepmother (here named Eurytia) to be killed, after they were slandered (presumably by her). A second-century BC Cyzicene temple contained a bas-relief depicting the stepsons (here named Polymedes and Clytius) killing their "Phrygian stepmother" while their mother Cleopatra looks on with delight.

In the first-century BC account of the Greek historian Diodorus Siculus, the sons were imprisoned, but apparently not blinded. According to Diodorus, when the Argonauts landed in Thrace, they found Phineus' sons shut up inside a burial vault, where they had been continually whipped, having been falsely accused of rape by their stepmother Idaea, the daughter of the Scythian king Dardanus. Rescued by the Argonauts, the sons wanted to torture Idaea to death, but dissuaded by Heracles, they instead sent Idaea back to her father in Scythia, urging him to punish her. And there Idaea was condemned to death.

Just as in the scholion to Antigone, the first- or second-century AD mythographer Apollodorus, says that Phineus' second wife Idaea, the daughter of Dardanus, falsely accused her stepsons (here named Plexippus and Pandion) of rape, so Phineus, believing Idaea, blinded his sons.
