= Las Incantadas =

Former building and sculptures from Salonica

Las Incantadas Οι Μαγεμένες
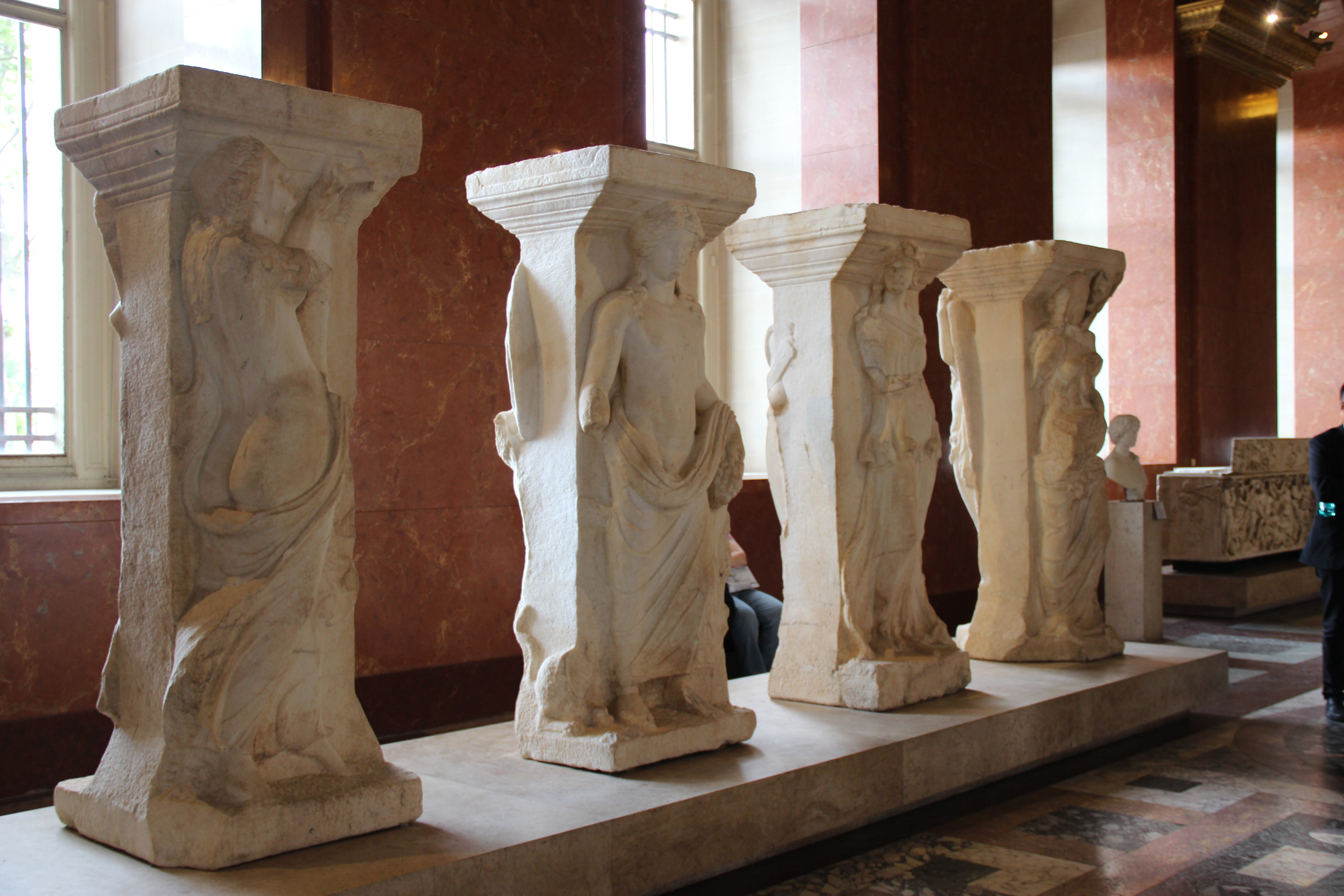
- Side 2 of the pillars in the Louvre

General information
- Status: Demolished (sculptures transferred to the Louvre)
- Architectural style: Corinthian rhythm
- Location: Thessaloniki, Greece; France (sculptures)
- Completed: 2nd century AD
- Demolished: 1864

Height
- Height: 12,70 m.

Technical details
- Material: Marble

Las Incantadas of Salonica (Note: [las eŋkanˈtaðas]; despite the spelling with an 'i', it is pronounced Encantadas, like in standard Spanish.) (Greek: Μαγεμένες της Θεσσαλονίκης or Λας Ινκαντάδας, meaning "the enchanted ones") is a group of Roman sculptures from a portico dating to the second century AD that once adorned the Roman Forum of Thessalonica in Northern Greece, and were considered to be among the most impressive and prestigious monuments of the city. Based on descriptions by travellers, it consisted of five Corinthian columns with four of them having bilateral sculptures on each pillar above. The sculptures were removed in 1864 by French paleologist Emmanuel Miller and placed in the Louvre museum in France, while the rest of the building collapsed and was destroyed. A fragment from a lost, fifth pillar was discovered in the city in the late twentieth century.

Greece is seeking the return of the sculptures, although with little success. In 2015 faithful copies of the four pillars were produced and have been exhibited ever since in the archaeological museum of the city. When first displayed that year, it was the first time in over one hundred and fifty years that the city got to see the enchanted sculptures in some form again.

== Name ==
It is unknown what name, if any, the colonnade was known by in antiquity. During the Ottoman Empire, the monument was known by several bynames among the multicultural city's inhabitants. In Greek, they were originally called Είδωλα ("idols") while in Judaeo-Spanish spoken by the Sephardic community, it was las Incantadas, meaning "the enchanted women", which also inspired the current Greek name, Μαγεμένες (Magemenes, "enchanted ones"). Turkish inhabitants of the city dubbed it Ottoman Turkish: صورت ملك, romanized: suret malek, lit. 'Angel Forms'), while other names include portico of the idols, or Goetria (it is mentioned as Goetria the Incantada by Stuart and Revett in 1754).

In modern times they are commonly referred to as the Caryatids of Salonica, and also Elgins of Thessaloniki based on their removal in 1864, similar to the Elgin Marbles, sculptures of the Parthenon removed by Scottishman Thomas Bruce, 7th Earl of Elgin earlier the same century.

== Location ==
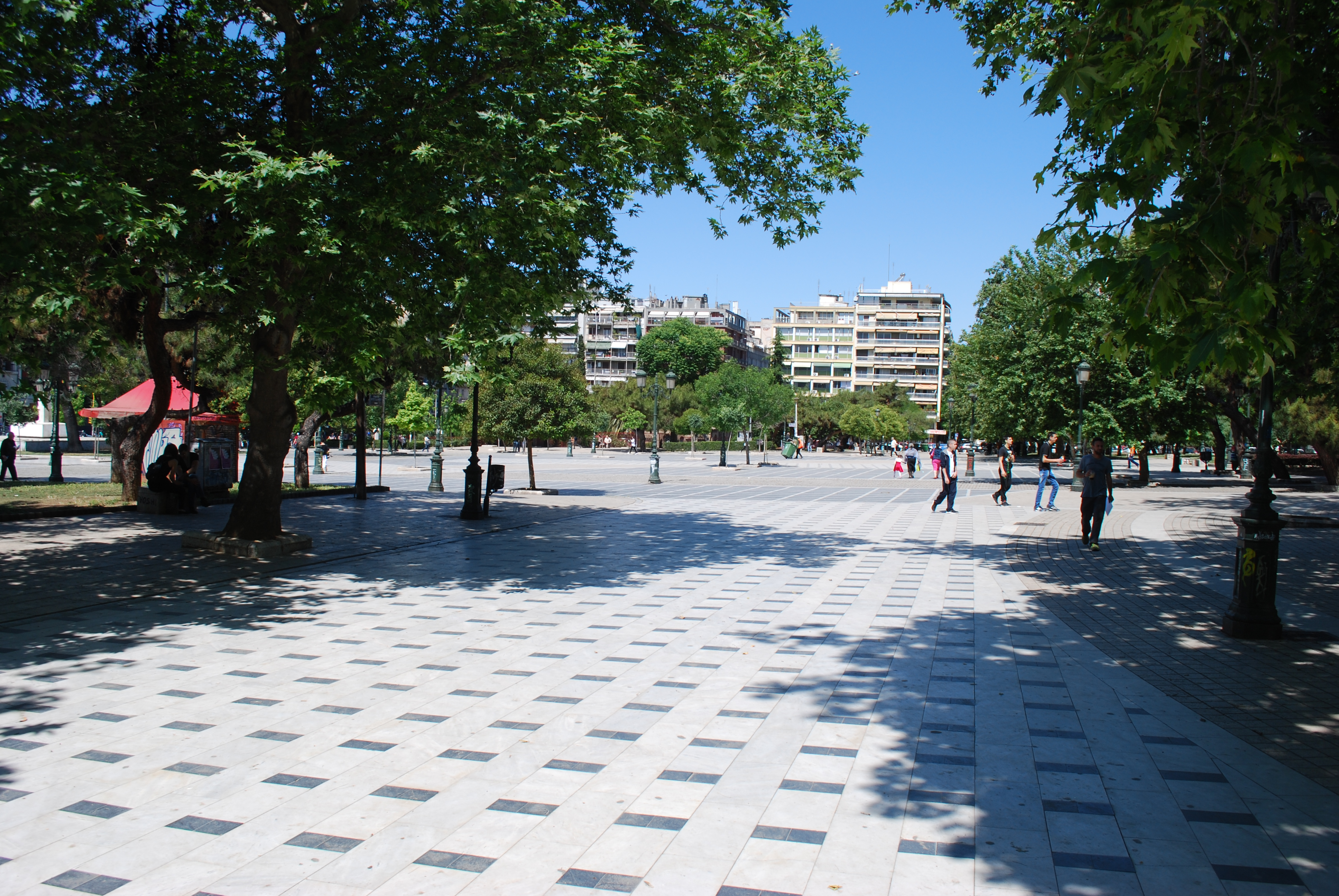
The plot where the Incantadas once stood in the modern day.

It is believed that the portico was located in the Jewish quarter of Rogos (area around today's Chalkeon Street next to the Church of Panagia Chalkeon) behind the Bey Hamam, close to the Roman Forum. The fact that it had sculptures on both sides indicates that the building's use was intended for both sides. Various assumptions have been made as to what its use was, it is quite likely that it was the entrance to the Roman market, or that it was a dividing border between the palaestra and the platform, or even propylaea of the hippodrome.

In a topographical plan by Ernest Hébrard, who was involved in the reconstruction of Thessaloniki after the Great Fire of 1917, its location was marked in the wider area behind the baths of Bay Hamam.

== History ==
=== Early descriptions ===
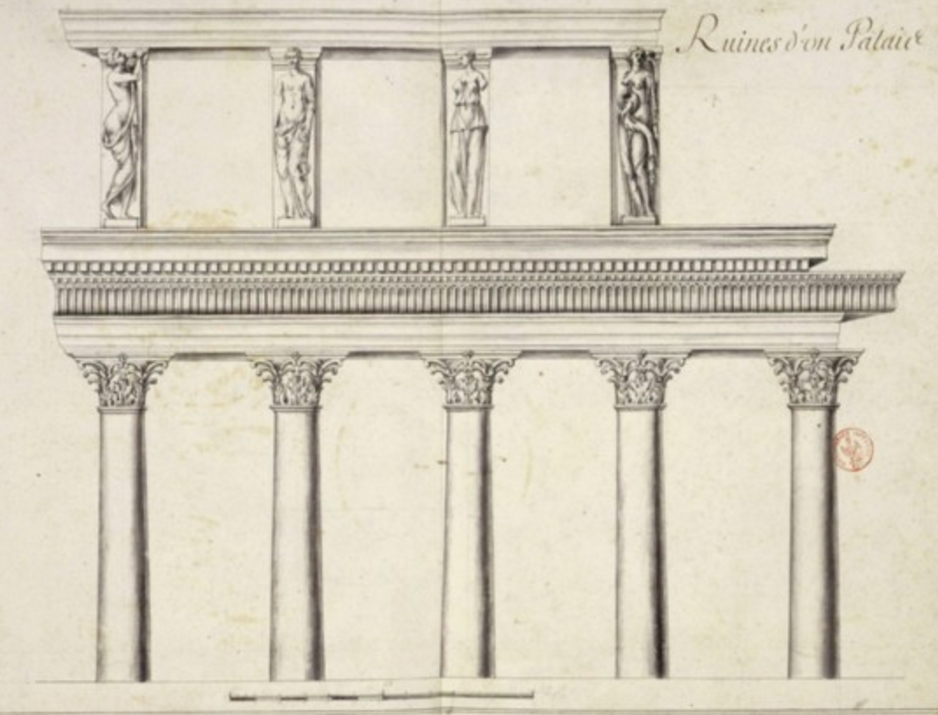
First depiction by Étienne Gravier d'Ortières, 1685.

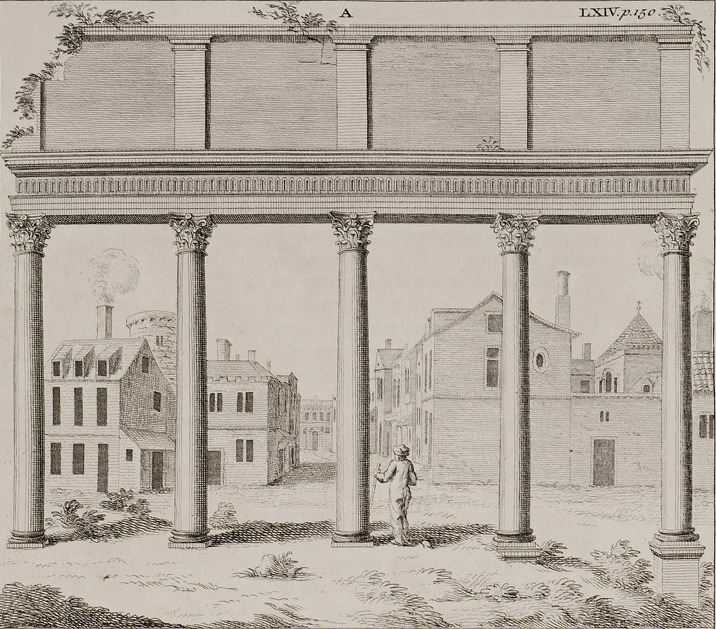
1745 engraving by Pococke.

The oldest reference to Las Incantadas comes courtesy of Italian traveller Cyriacus of Ancona in 1431, shortly after the Fall of Thessalonica to the Ottomans. He described it briefly as a demolished temple of Artemis on which figures of gods were depicted. The first depiction of the portico was made between 1685 and 1687 by Frenchman Étienne Gravier d'Ortières, where the basic layout of the monument is shown without a high level of detail, and is described as ruins of a palace. He was followed by British anthropologist Richard Pococke in 1740, who, although he described the sculptures of the columns, the designer who drew the pictures based on his descriptions depicted the monument without the sculptures as well as placing it in a fictional space that did not correspond to reality.

The monument is also allegedly depicted on an unidentified, possibly Venetian, old map of Thessaloniki in which all the monuments of the city are marked with Italian descriptions. There under the title colonne (columns) it appears to have a total of eight columns in two sections of three and five respectively which join each other forming an angle, the monument as it was originally if some other part of them had not been destroyed even earlier.

=== Stuart and Revett ===
The most detailed description of the building with accompanying engravings was done in 1754 by British classicists James Stuart and Nicholas Revett who had been sent by the Society of Dilettanti, producing a number of pictures and engravings that were published for the first time in the third volume of The Antiquities of Athens in 1762. The monument is described as a Corinthian colonnade accompanied by statues at the top. In one of these pictures, where the building is depicted in its entirety, the inscription on the epistle Ν[-]ΓΕΓΕΝΗΜΕΝΟΝ[-]ΥΠΟ ('was made under') can be seen, possibly mentioning the name of the sponsor of the work or the local lord of city. The part with the inscription, however, was no longer preserved during the period of the representation, but it means that the portico of Las Incantadas was considerably larger on both sides. A significant part of the building was below ground, and its actual height was significantly greater. Carrying out a partial excavation, they determined the total height of the building to be 12.70 meters.

When comparing their engravings with the sole surviving photograph of the sculptures while they were still in the city, it becomes clear that Stuart and Revett depicted the arrangement of the pillars erroneously. In their works the two presented the order of the reliefs of the eastern side (Side 1) in reverse, from left to right. In the photograph however it is evident that in reality the order was the other way round than the one they drew in the paper, so that the far left first pillar in the engraving is in fact the rightmost fourth pillar, and vice versa for the pillar in the far right, which is actually the very first of the colonnade from left to right. The order in which they drew the western (Side 2) reliefs is correct.

In their writings they also conveyed the popular tradition of the Greek inhabitants, according to which the monument was part of a portico that connected with the palace of Alexander the Great. When the king of Thrace once visited the city, his wife fell in love with Alexander and they met secretly through this portico. As soon as the king found out about this, he had a magic spell cast on the building so that anyone passing by would be petrified. So the king's wife with her attendant were petrified and became statues, and so did the king with his magician who had gone to see if they had caught the witches, while Alexander did not appear that night as according to the story had been warned by his tutor Aristotle.

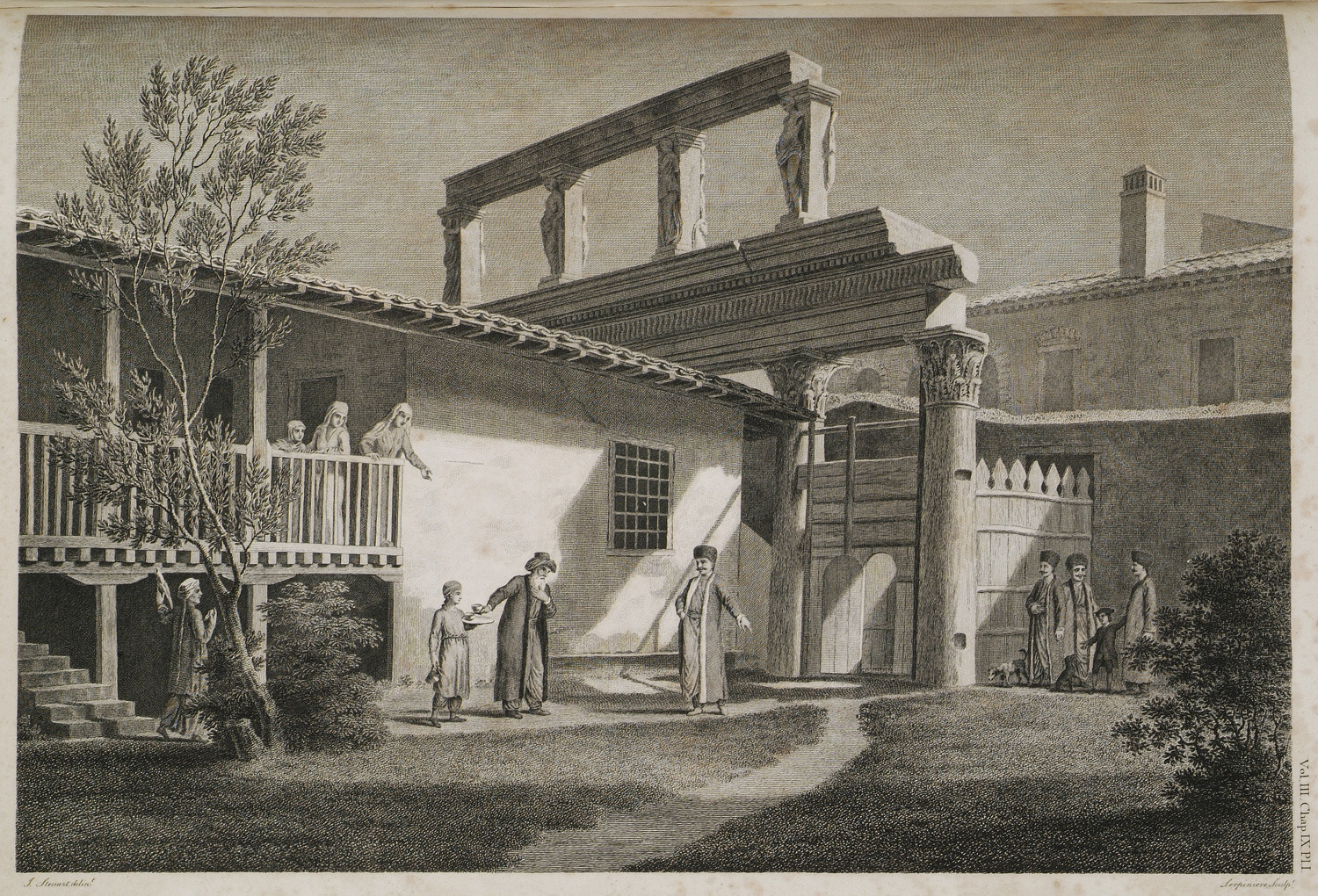
Depiction of the building.

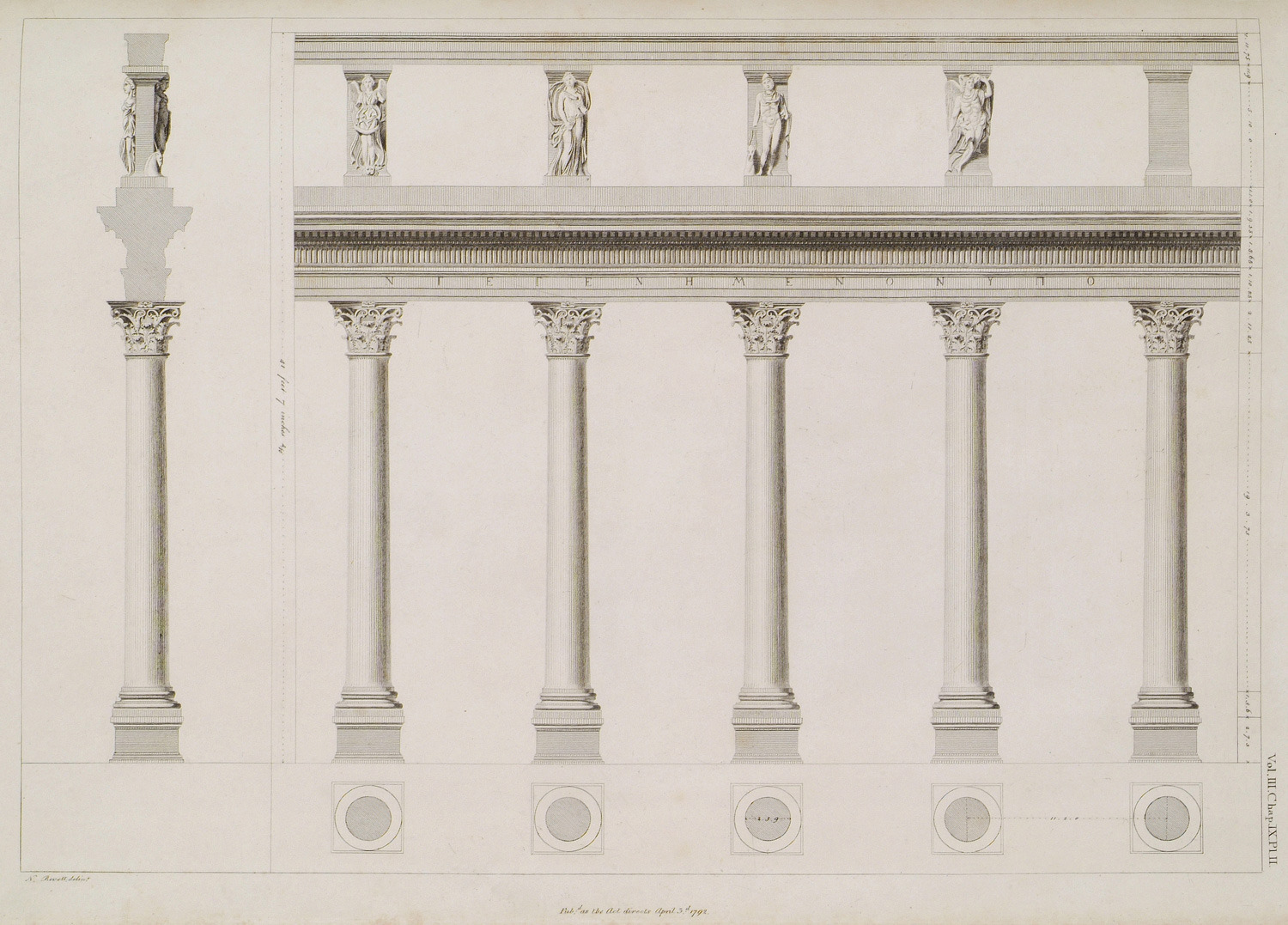
Reconstruction; incorrect Side 1 order depiction.

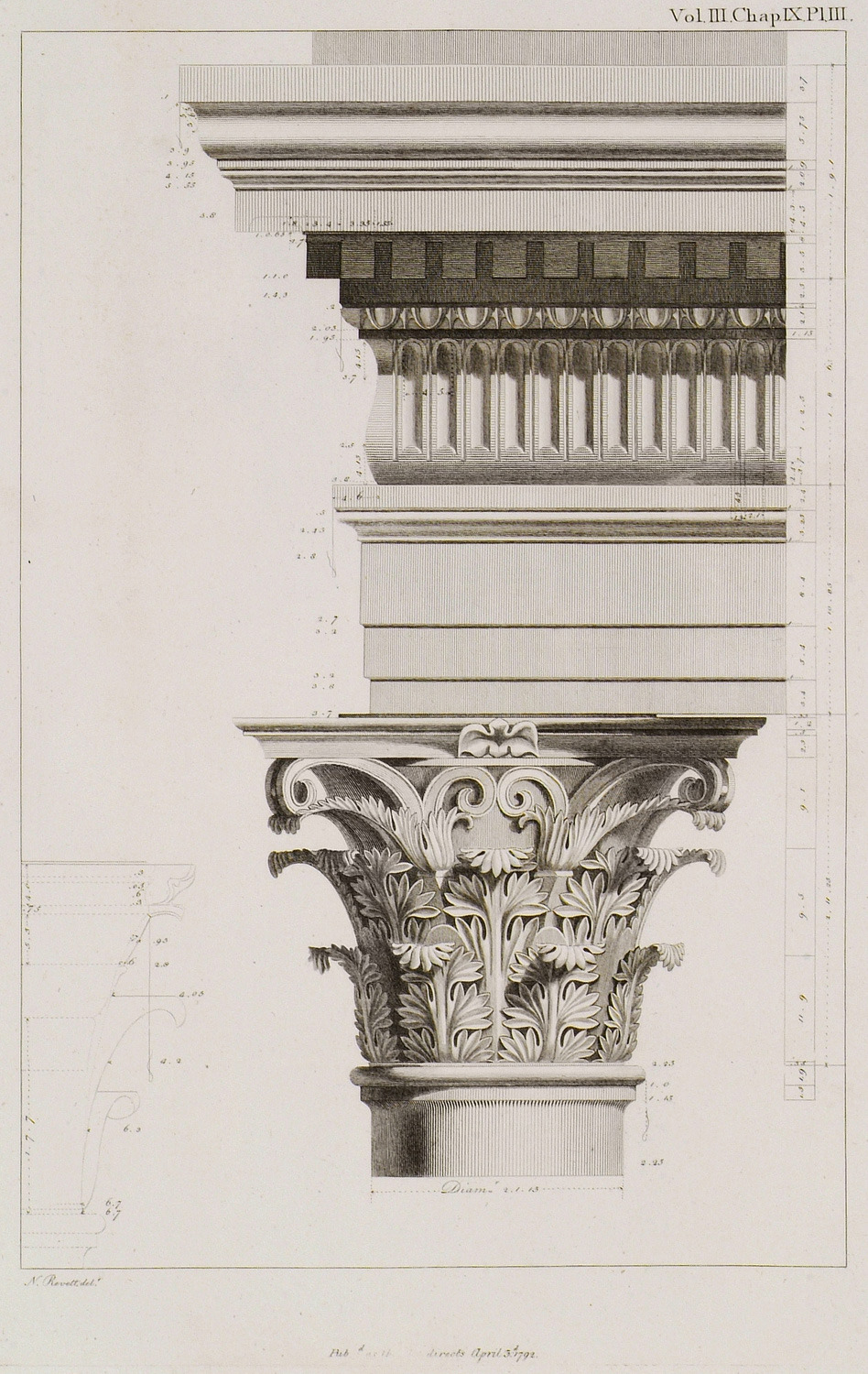
Detail of the columns.

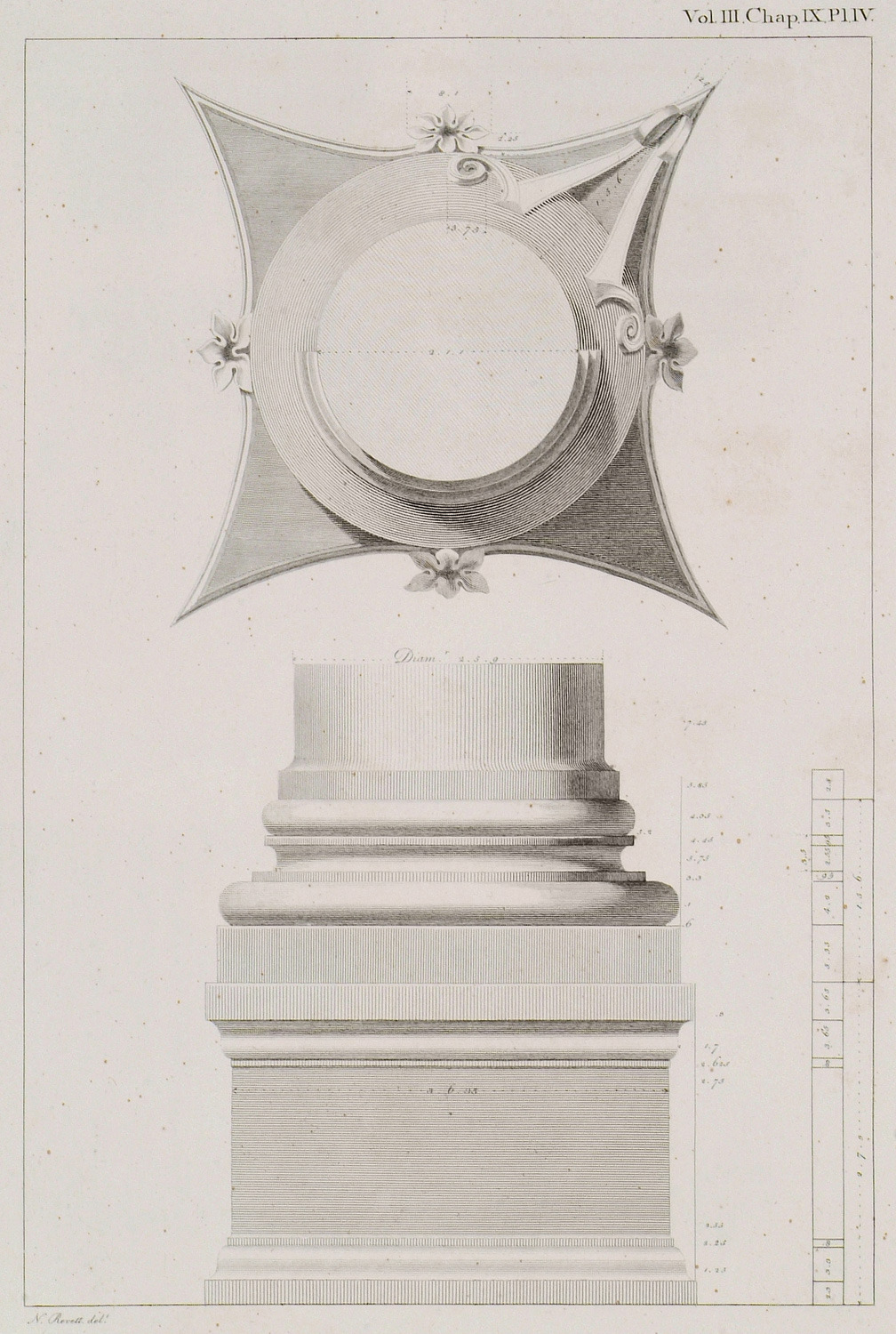
Base detail.

=== Late eighteenth to twentieth centuries ===
Louis-François-Sébastien Fauvel also produced engravings in 1782, which was published in 1831 by French archaeologist Esprit-Marie Cousinéry, with a drawing quite similar to that of the house by Stuart and Revett from the same angle. In 1800 excavations around the building were carried out by French consul Félix de Beaujour who gave its total height as 12,5 meters, with a column length of 1,98 m. (including the bases) above ground 5,49 m. underneath. Beaujour requested to take the fourth pillar, which was the best preserved one, but his offer was declined by the local pasha.

Similar buildings existed in various cities that were once part of the Roman Empire. In early twentieth century French archaeologist Paul Perdrizet, who examined the sculptures after they had been moved to the Louvre, brought up the third-century pillared building Piliers de Tutelle from the city Bordeaux in France, which shows several similarities but is no longer preserved as it was demolished in 1677.

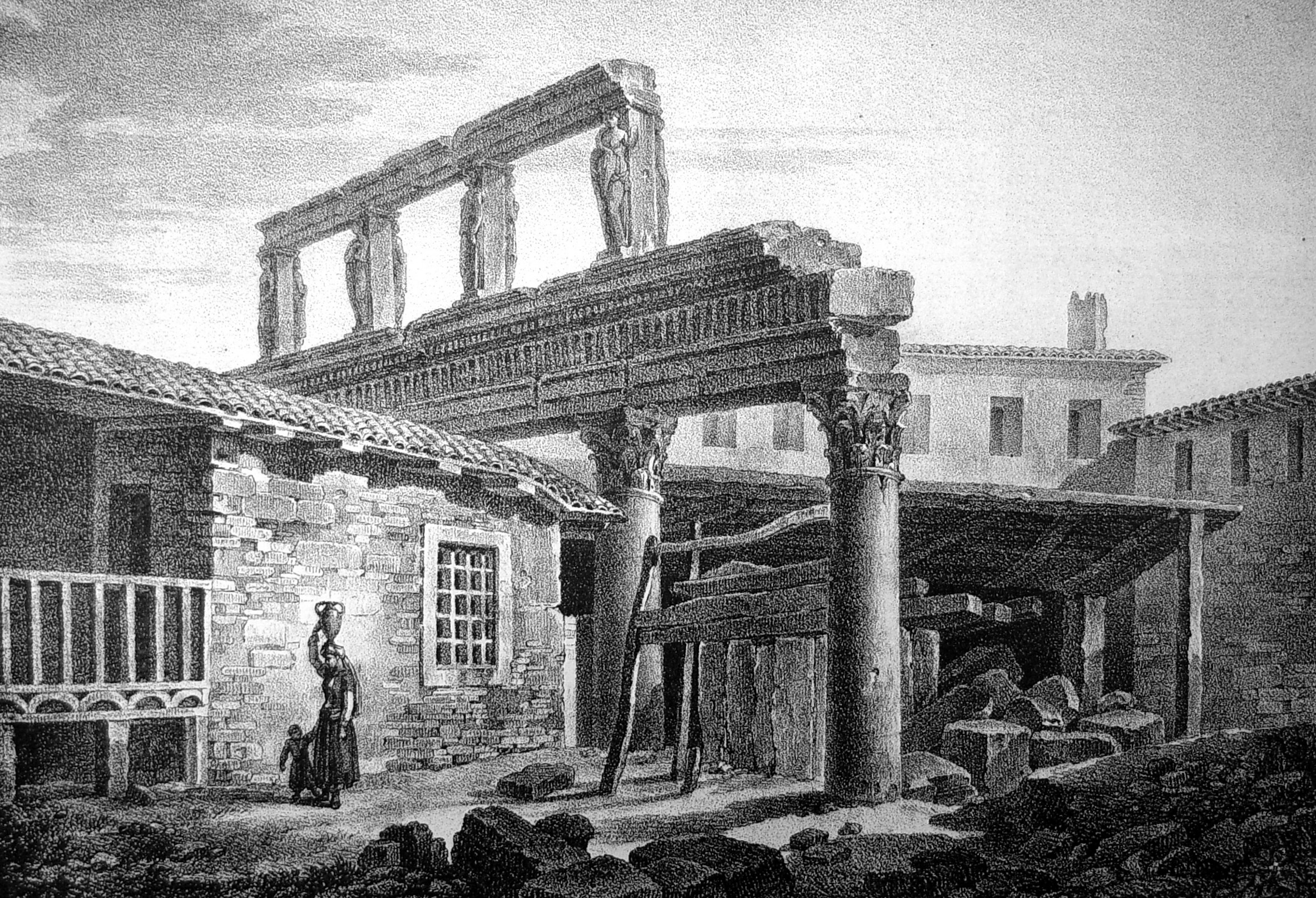
Fauvel 1782, published in 1831.

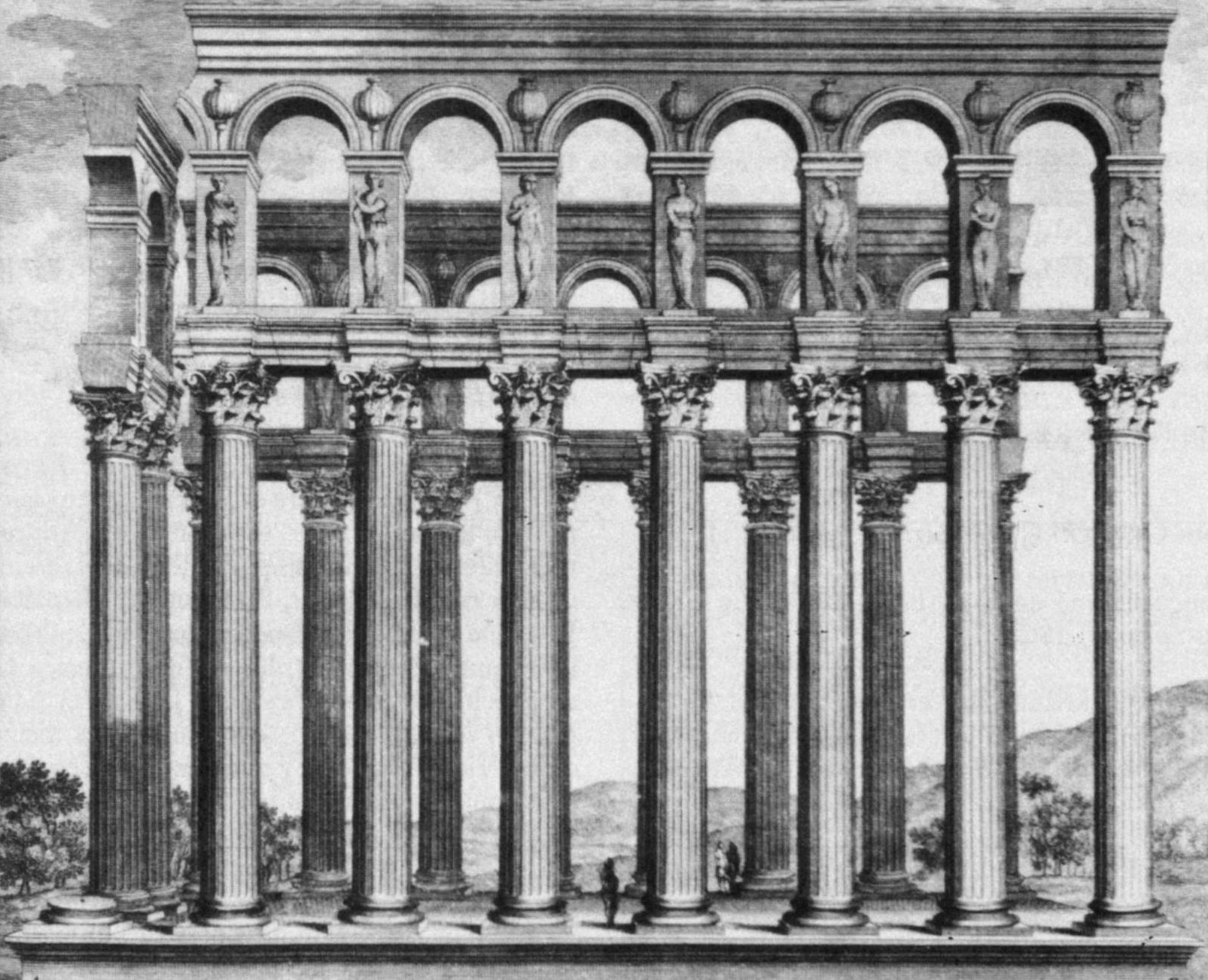
Piliers de Tutelle in Bordeaux, demolished in 1677

== Removal ==
Emmanuel Miller was a French palaeologist who was sent on a mission by Napoleon III to acquire antiquities from other countries outside France. He was escorted by painter and photographer Pierre-Désiré Guillemet. Miller himself described their trip on a diary he kept, where he says that at first he had gone to Mount Athos in order to find rare manuscripts. There, after facing the suspicion of the monks, he failed to collect anything of value, and then he passed on to Thasos, from where he obtained a large number of antiquities. During his meeting with the French consul, the consul told him that he should not leave anything behind or the British would have them. Learning about the attractions of Salonica he learned about the monument that was located, he asked permission from the governor to remove the sculptures, but the pasha told him that he would have to get permission from the imperial capital Constantinople, which was done soon after as the French embassy intervened and the permission was given by the Grand Vizier.

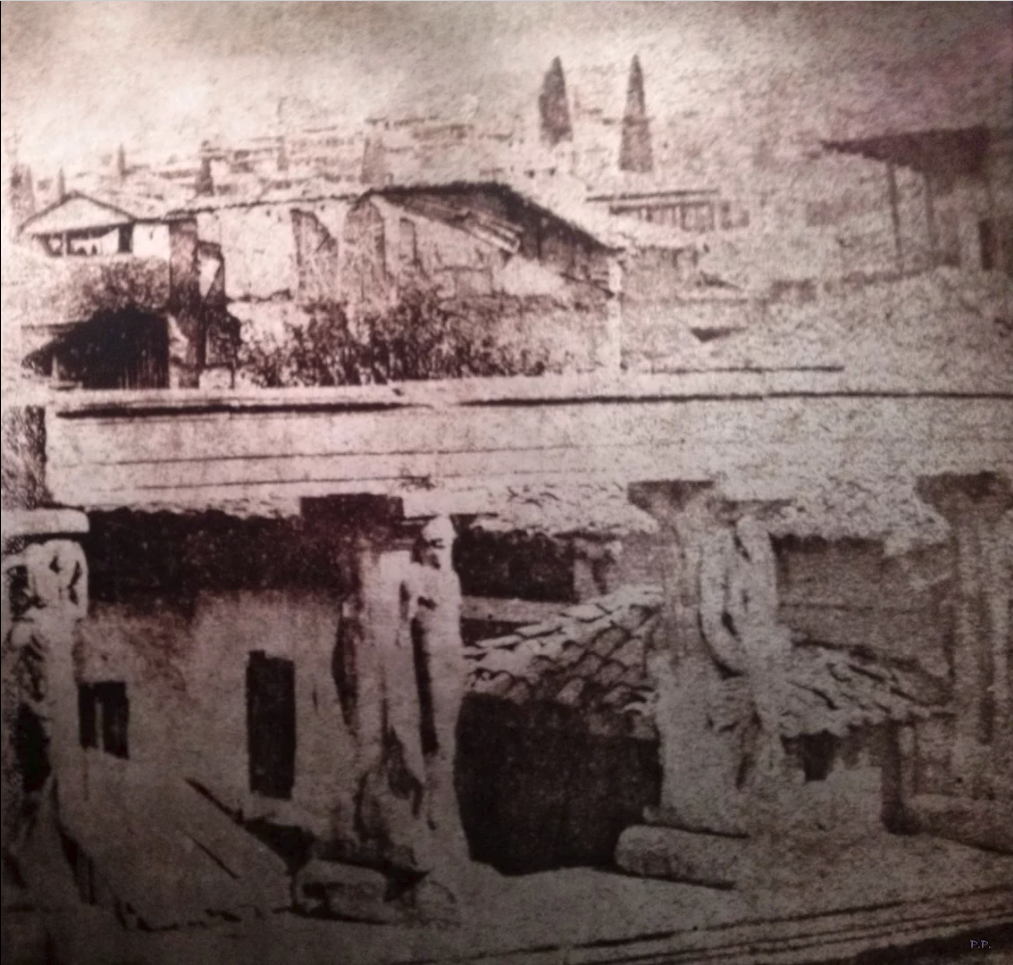
The only known photo of La Incantadas in Salonica, 1864.

He came to Thessaloniki on October 30, 1864, arriving on a French warship, and he ran aground not in the port of the city but in another location on the advice of the French consul, so that the transfer of the antiquities would remain as unnoticed by the general public as possible. Miller then learned from the French ambassador that a message had come from France asking him to expropriate not only the marble reliefs but the entire monument, reliefs, columns, metopes, etc. This proved impossible as the weight would have been enormous, as he did not have the necessary equipment but neither could the ship bear such a weight. The news of the removal of the monument were spread and caused an uproar among the Thessalonican population. Miller wrote how he did not understand why they reacted this way since the janissaries had a hobby of shooting the sculptures for fun, and the Jewish owner of the house next to the monument occasionally broke pieces and sold them to tourists.

Shortly before the removal began, Guillemet took a photograph of the monument standing on a neighboring building, which is the only known photograph surviving of Las Incantadas' original location in Thessaloniki. At the same time, it had become known that Las Incantadas would be removed, and there was an outcry from the inhabitants of the city (Turks, Jews and Greeks) and minor incidents followed. On November 1, Miller began the removal work, cordoned off the area, and had the assistance of Turkish police who kept the crowd at bay, while in the days that followed they would throw water at the crowd to keep it from congregating.

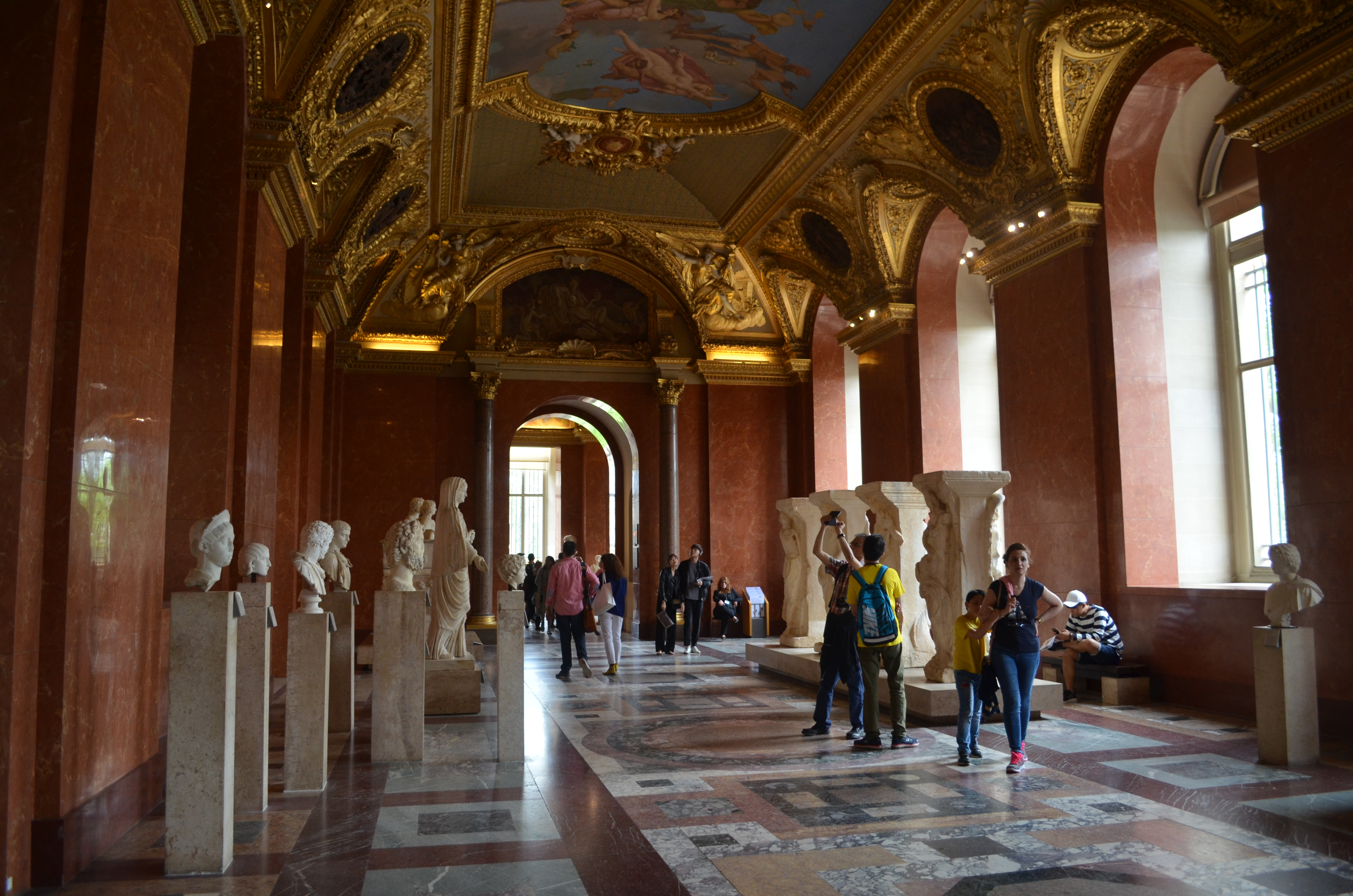
Las Incantadas in the Louvre in 2014.

So the slab that was over the pillars with the reliefs was removed first, and then the pillars themselves. One of them, that of the goddess Nike, fell to the ground as it escaped the winch and in its fall a small part of it that was not on the side of the sculpture was broken. On the 12th of November, the removal of the pillars was completed, and their transport began, together with the architrave and the stylobates (the column bases), with the bullock carts that had been assisted by the Turkish pasha. Transporting through the narrow streets of the city with its potholes and sharp corners proved to be particularly difficult. After the completion of the transport and unloading of the sculptures on the French warship, Miller extended his stay in the city for a few more weeks, until the end of December, and with regard to the heavier parts of the monument he stated in his writings that if he were unable to move them then he would leave them on the streets, and that perhaps the church of Hagios Nicolaos could make use these marbles.

Miller, who had desired to move the entire monument and erect it in France was unable to do due to the insufficient tools and ships; he regretted having destroyed the entire colonnade when it became clear he could not move it as well and would only be able to take the four pillars, pieces of the architrave and the capitals of the five columns. He wrote that demolishing the entire thing just for the sculptures was no better than vandalism or the work of barbarians. Miller, not being an archaeologist himself, did not make any topographical studies or other notes about where the monument was located. When delivered to the Louvre, there was no accompanying inventory of the finds, and the pieces were mixed up with others taken from Thasos.

== The sculptures ==
=== Dating ===
The dating of the monument was based on the examination of the sculptures in the Louvre, and on the basis of the study of the representations of the travelers. Various periods have been proposed, from the mid-second century to the end of the third, with the consensus being in the second century. Initially it was suggested that the monument was from the Diocletian period (late third to early fourth century) as it shows some architectural similarities with Diocletian's Palace near ancient Salona. However, there was the counter-argument that there are differences in the dimensions of the capitals, and at the same time in terms of the representations of the sculptures, especially those of Aura and Dionysus, indicate that the reliefs cannot belong to later periods when the art had already begun to change, which is however not absolute. The main argument for dating it to the second century focuses on the fact that the Corinthian-style capitals show many similarities to those found in two small second-century temples in the market of Philippi, as well as to other architectural finds of the same period on the facade of the Captives in Corinth, and the Odeon of Agrippa in Athens. Based on these details, the style of the monument and the sculptures are influenced by Hellenistic art, while the work itself seems to be a typical example of the local Greek architecture of Thessaloniki.

=== The mythological figures ===
The Greek deities and mortal people depicted in the portico are sculpted in high relief, and eight in total, arranged in pairs of two for each of the four pillars. The figures are Dionysus, the god of wine; Ariadne, his wife and princess of Crete; Aura, a breeze goddess associated with Bacchic myth; a Maenad, a female follower of Dionysus; Leda, queen of Sparta; Ganymede, cup-bearer of the gods; Nike, goddess of victory; and finally one of the Dioscuri, the twin sons of Leda. They are paired together as follows: Leda with Ganymede (two mortals seduced by Zeus in the form of an animal), Nike with the Maenad (close companions of a specific deity, Athena and Dionysus respectively), Ariadne with the Dioscurus (demigods who eventually ascended to godhood) and Dionysus with Aura (in some versions, Aura is the mother of Iacchus by Dionysus).

All four pillars are 206 cm in height and 75 cm in width and depth, and weigh a little over two tonnes, with the exception of the fourth pillar (Ganymede-Leda) which weighs 1960 kg.

==== Pillar 1 (Nike-Maenad) ====
The first pillar depicts the goddess of victory, Nike, on side one and a Maenad on side 2. The winged Nike is shown frontal, staring straight ahead, her hair tied in an elegant hairstyle (dubbed ‘Apollo's knot’). She wears an ankle-long chiton which is held at breast height with a thing long ribbon; folds are formed around her waist in an upward direction, almost as if the air is puffing up the soft fabric. The drapery then clings to her high-rising legs so it almost looks like it is wet, while on the left and right the rest of the chiton is sculpted in low relief, creating many folds. The sculptor used those tricks to indicate both flight (the folds on her waist) but also the goddess's eventual landing (the folds around her legs). Her feet once rested on an unknown, perhaps circular, object that has been scrapped off long ago; Stuart and Revett restored it in their engraving as a winged lion's head. In knee-length are preserved the remains of what was once a garland full of flowers or leaves that the goddess was no doubt holding with her lost hands and arms; only her shoulders are still intact. The figure of Nike has been occasionally identified as Cybele, an Anatolian mother-goddess, or even Hermes.

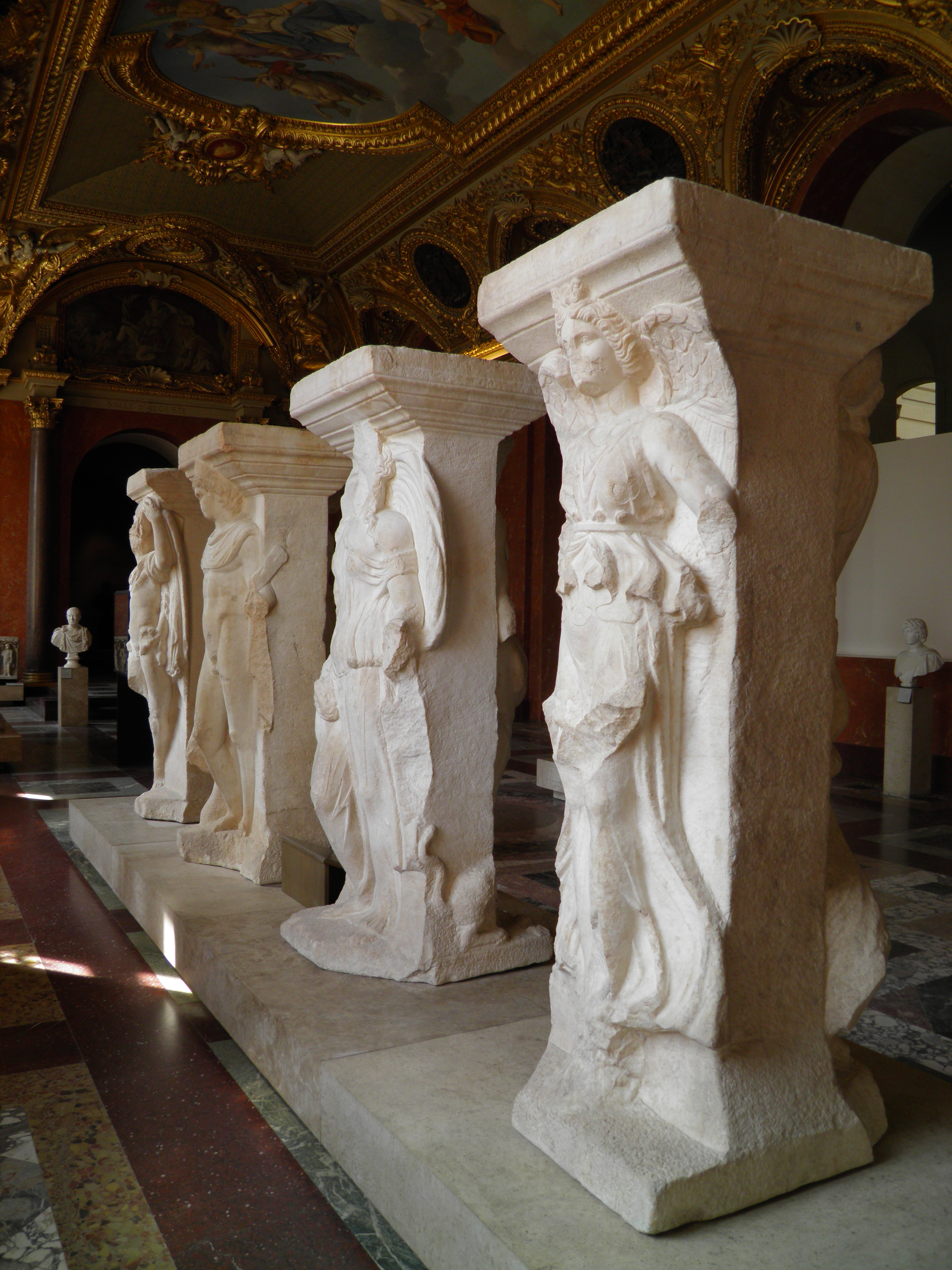
Las Incantadas in the Louvre.

On the other side, the figure of the Maenad can be found. The Maenads were female followers of Dionysus. Out of the eight reliefs, the ecstatic woman alone is depicted in full profile. Her hair is richly tressed and fall in locks on her back and shoulders; her head is slightly lifted and bent backwards to show how she is possessed of bacchic madness. She is playing a double-flute which had already been broken off by the time Stuart and Revett visited the city; in their engraving, they make the Maenad play a single-tube trumpet instead. The Maenad is half-naked, and only lightly draped in a thin himation (a type of cloak) which leaves most of her upper torso and thigh exposed, and she is also barefoot. The subtle waves of her drapery and the position of her feet and toes give off the impression of the woman's movement to the right. The double-flute, most of her right arm and parts of the drapery are not preserved. Prokesch von Osten originally identified this figure as Pheme, the Greek goddess of fame (Roman Fama).

==== Pillar 2 (Aura-Dionysus) ====
Like Nike, Aura, a minor goddess of the breeze, is depicted frontal on side 1 of the second pillar. Her movement has been described as 'slow walking' as she is slightly bending and lifting her right leg off the ground, while placing all of her weight on her left leg (contrapposto). Her head is slightly turned to the right, her hair elegantly tied in a knot with a ribbon, while locks fall freely on her shoulders. She wears a thin, almost transparent, chiton that embraces her body as if wet, creating deep and elaborate folds all over her body. The chiton is pinned at her shoulders, but the left one has slid off, revealing more skin. She is also holding a billowing cloak (velificatio), a stylistic choice in ancient Roman art used to signify vigorous movement, celestial and sea deities. Aura's face is entirely gone (Stuart and Revett restored it in the 1754 engraving like they did with many missing elements of Las Incantadas), as is most of her right forearm, though the hand survives, softly pressed against her hip. Her left forearm, similarly gone, was probably holding the end of the billowing cloak. The figure of Aura was identified by von Osten as a Bacchante, while Stuart and Revett saw Helen of Troy in her, having mistakenly identified the male figure next to her (the Dioscurus) as Paris. A Nereid was also proposed as a possible identity.

Side 2 has Dionysus, the god of wine, madness and festive ecstasy. Dionysus is shown as a beautiful youth, frontal, his head inclined to the right, his rich-tressed hair crowned with grapes and vine leaves and reaching down to his shoulders and chest in waves. Dionysus rests his weight on his right leg, while his left leg is bent and relaxed. His left arm is rested on a grapevine, and is holding grapes. To the god's right a panther stood once (and not a tiger, as Stuart and Revett drew), though most of it is now missing. The panther was probably looking up at his young master. Dionysus's right forearm is broken off a bit below the elbow; he was probably holding a kantharos in his missing right hand. Chips of Dionysus's face and jaw are also missing. The god is depicted half-naked; he is only wearing a light garment which has slipped off at the height of his hips, revealing his genitalia. According to Guerrini, Las Incantadas Dionysus has many elements in common with Apollo's iconography, particularly the statue of Apollo that Emperor Hadrian is depicted sacrificing to in one of the tondo reliefs of the triumphal Arch of Constantine in Rome. Both types of design are in turn derived from older, Hellenistic works, especially the Timarchis Apollo and one of the Drunken Dionysus with Satyr complexes.

==== Pillar 3 (Dioscurus-Ariadne) ====
The male figure is depicted frontal, in slow motion, his body weight supported on the left foot, while he is about to get his right foot off the ground. He is almost entirely nude save for a short chlamys draped around his neck and falling on his left arm. On his head he wears the characteric pilos, the half egg-shaped hat that identifies him as one of the Dioscuri, the twin sons of Leda and brothers of Helen. His face, although preserved, is a bit damaged, and both arms are missing at around elbow height (the left elbow is preserved). He was probably holding a short sword in his lost left hand, but traces of a seathe and girdle are still visible. His right hand would have held the bridle of the bull-horned horse that stands to his right. The presence of the horse caused Stuart and Revett to identify the man as the hero Telephus, while Clarke and Gottling chose Paris, for they mistook his pilos for a Phrygian cap, a reoccurring feature of Paris's depiction in ancient Greek and Roman art. Pococke and Froehner recognised him as Hermes. Hermes, a pastoral god, was also the god who led the souls to the Underworld; thus leading Froehner to suggest that Las Incantadas was part of a mausoleum complex or some other funerary building.

On the other side of the pillar stands Ariadne, princess of Crete. Ariadne is also frontal, if somewhat inclined to the right, and in slow motion/walking like the Dioscurus and Aura; her right foot is about to leave the ground, with her left leg supporting all her weight. Her head is turned to the right and is adorned with vine leaves and grapes, just like Dionysus's. Her long and flowing hair reach down her shoulders and armpits; her rightwards-inclined face, in half profile, is full of passion and adoration directed at her husband. Her long dress is tied with a plant-decorated belt below her breast, and forms multiple folds near her legs. Just like the Aura relief, with whom it shares many characteristics, Ariadne's chiton is pinned at her shoulders, but on the left the chiton has slipped off, almost revealing her bossom. Ariadne of Las Incantadas has no clear sculptural type, nor is there an obvious original design which is copied for Ariadne here. Prokesch von Osten mistook Ariadne for a Bacchante.

==== Pillar 4 (Ganymede-Leda) ====
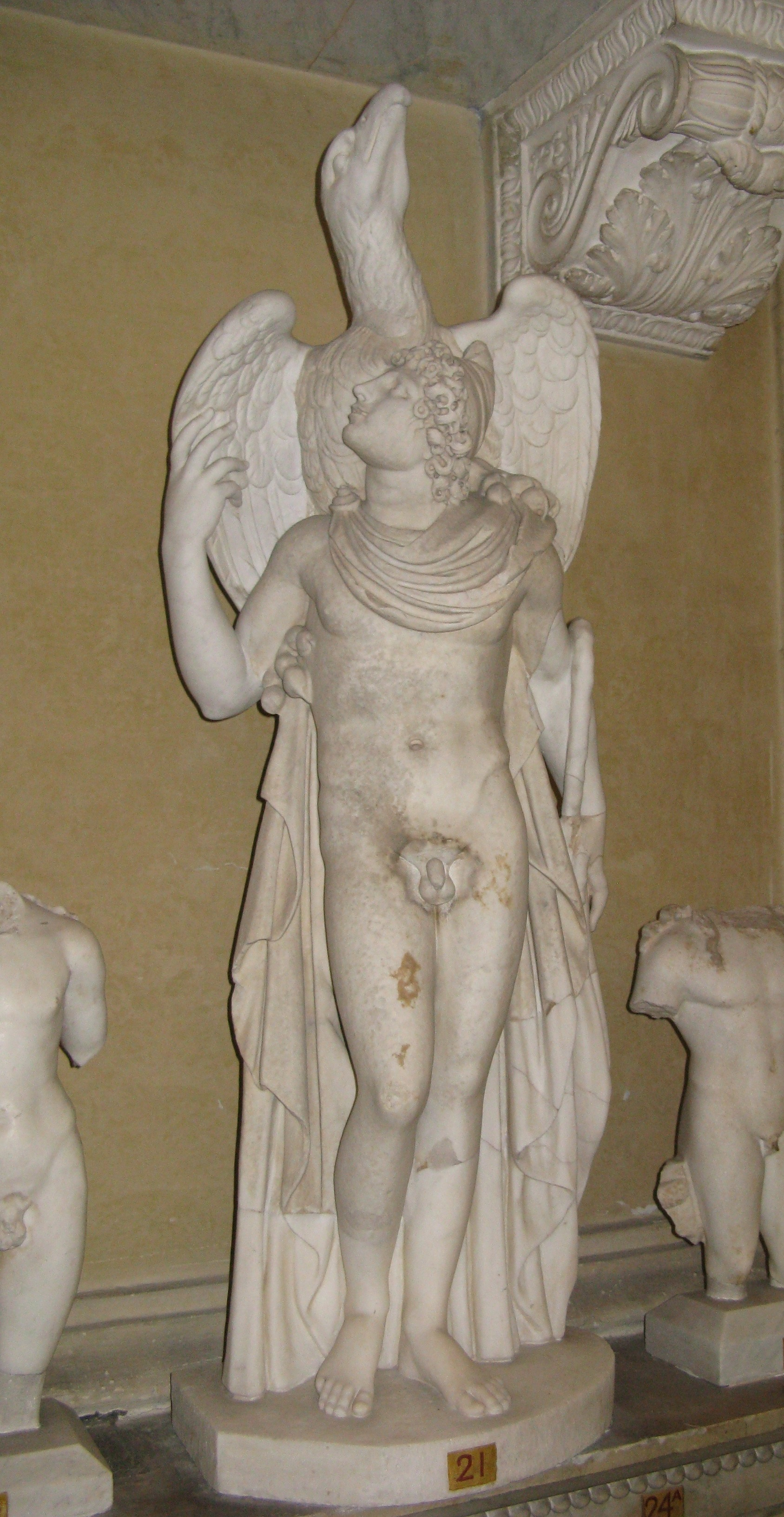
Statuette of Ganymede and the eagle, Museo Chiaramonti

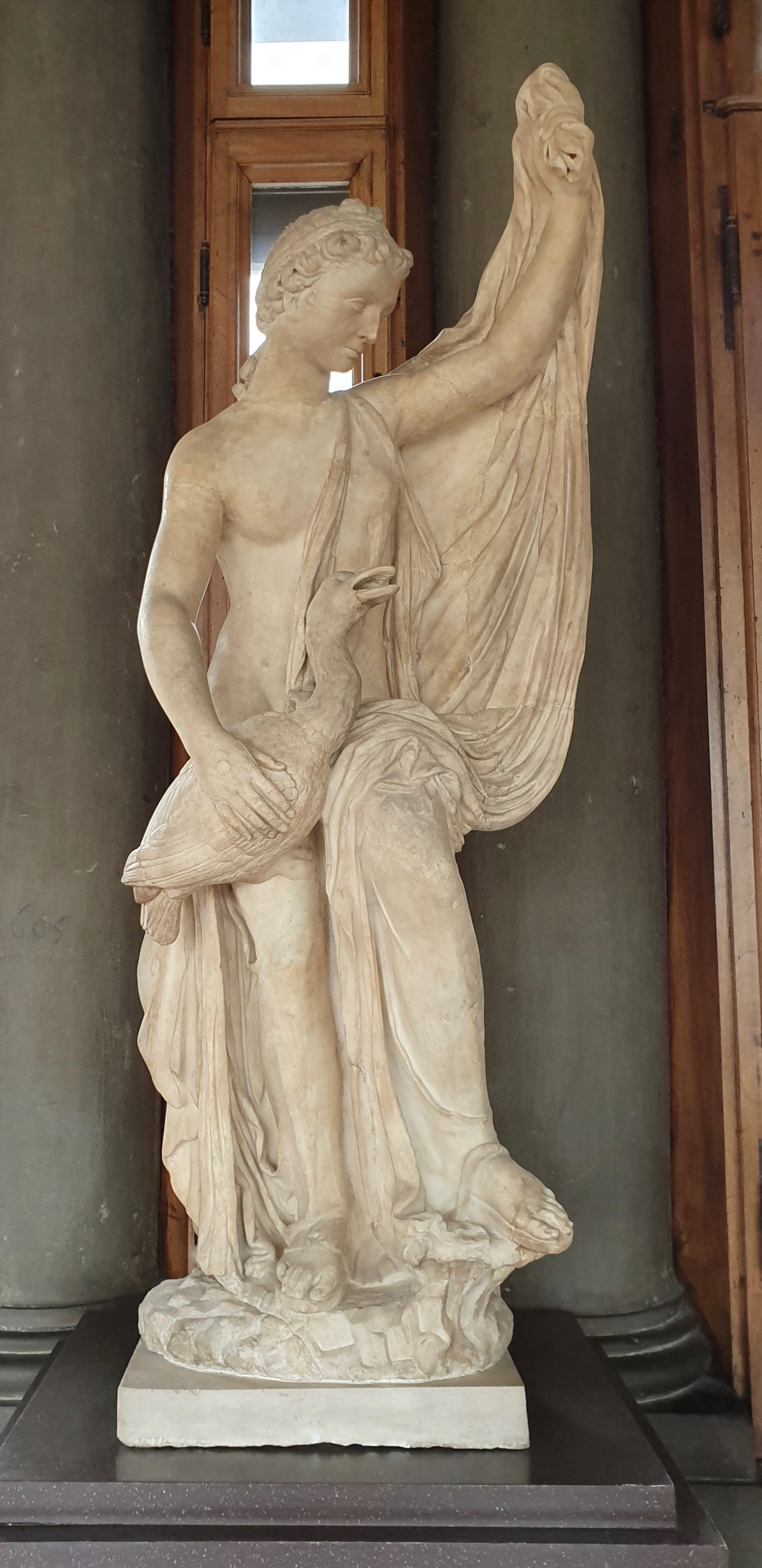
Statue of Leda and the swan, Uffizi

The fourth pillar is generally regarded to be the best-preserved one. Side 1 depicts without a doubt the rape of the Trojan prince Ganymede by Zeus who is transformed into an eagle. Save for his head sneaking from behind the boy's shoulder, the eagle is sculpted in low relief behind Ganymede, his wings spread, his talons firmly grabbing the youth by the hips and lifting him off the ground; the motion of flight is achieved with Ganymede's toes, which are barely touching the base of the pillar. Ganymede is almost fully nude, only wearing a Phrygian cap and a chlamys wrapped around his neck and left to fall at his left arm. He is caressing the eagle with his hand, and looking lovingly at him, and the eagle in turn is giving his prey a fierce gaze; it is a highly erotic scene. The statuary type that the Ganymede-eagle complex of Las Incantadas is based on was created during the fourth century BC in ancient Greece, and continued to be used well into the Roman period in depictions of Ganymede's abduction by Zeus; many Roman statues of this type survive to this day.

The eighth and final sculpture is that of Leda, the queen of Sparta, as she is being embraced by the swan, which is actually Zeus in disguise. Just like Dionysus, Leda is more than half naked and lightly dressed (or rather, draped) in a thin himation which does not cover her breasts, belly, feet and most of the arms. Most of her right arm is broken off, but the shoulder and the hand (firmly grasping the swan) are intact. The left arm and parts of the drapery are gone, but the vague shape is still visible. Her face is entirely missing. In their engraving, Stuart and Revett drew the missing face as slightly turned to the right, but the remains of the sculpture's head are clearly facing front, and if anything, a bit turned to the left. Leda's hair is also tied in an 'Apollo's knot', like Nike. Zeus, in the form of a swan, is covering most of her torso and rests his head in her chest, fondling Leda's bare breasts. There is a certain stiffness in Leda's raised arm and the hand that is holding the swan, indicating a defensive posture; the gullible Leda is trying to protect the swan from an external threat, perhaps an eagle, unwitting to what is about to happen next; the swan is already trying to remove her light garment with his leg.

==== Pillar 5 ====
In 1997, during the excavation work for a natural gas supply in Rogoti Street, well south of the ancient market, part of the head of a sculpture was discovered, which has been hypothesized to be part of a fifth relief, which collapsed during an earthquake in the seventh century. This assumption is based on the similarity of the sculpture as well as the fact that in the representations of the monument each column is accompanied by a pillar and a sculpture with the exception of the fifth column. That fragment is now exhibited in the Archaeological Museum of Thessaloniki. The fragment is of a damaged head with a wing next to it, and it has been identified as Nike, thanks to its identicalness with the Nike of the surviving column in the Louvre.

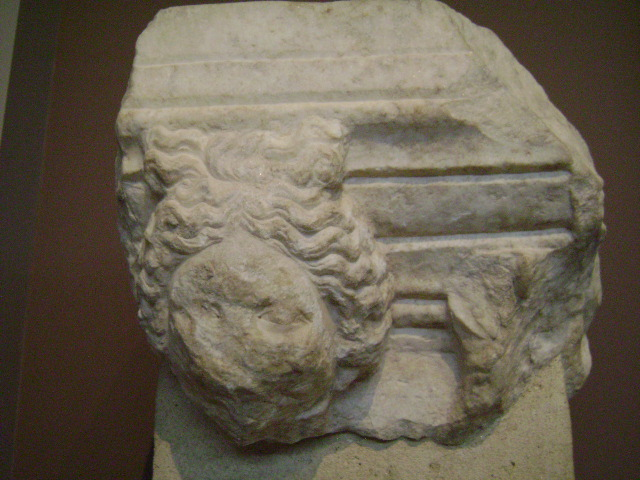
The fragment of Pillar V, identical to the Nike.

Papazoglou offered an alternative to the fifth sculpture theory; that the fragment found in 1997 is not a piece of a lost fifth pillar, but rather the original head of the Nike in the pillar that is now in the Louvre. Papazoglou bases his argument on Miller's own account of the removal; Miller writes that while removing the first pillar (Nike-Maenad) it fell down and a small piece was broken off, but insists that the relief of Nike itself was not damaged at all. Later, in fear of someone from the angry crowd stealing the fragment, he immediately ordered it to be brought aboard the ship. A Turkish soldier attacked one of Miller's entourage, not realising he was with Miller, causing him to drop the box containing the fragment. Miller again insists that no damage was done to the marble piece.

Papazoglou argues that the fragment was in fact the head of Nike, which never made it out of Thessaloniki, and that the pillar was later restored in France so that Miller could hide the fact that he lost a piece of Las Incantadas while transporting them. Adding to that, Papazoglou expressed doubt that the monument would sport two reliefs of the same deity and design. He is however positive to the idea that the original portico was made up of more than four pillars. Asterios Lioutas on the other hand argues that it is perfectly plausible for the portico to have had two Nikes, given that it has two depictions of (a transformed) Zeus, one as an eagle and one as a swan, on opposite sides of the same pillar. In accordance to the placement of the Zeus sculptures, the two Nike sculptures would have been on opposite sides of the portico; as the surviving Nike is on Side 1 with Ganymede, Aura and the Dioscurus, the fragment of Pillar V would have been on Side 2 with the Maenad, Dionysus, Ariadne and Leda. As for who was the figure on the other side of the pillar, the tenth, entirely lost sculpture, Lioutas speculates that it could have been another Maenad or perhaps a satyr.

		Pillar 1	Pillar 2	Pillar 3	Pillar 4
Side 1	Figure	Nike	Aura	Dioscurus	Ganymede
Side 1	Engraving (1754)				
Side 1	Sculpture in the Louvre				
Side 2	Figure	Maenad	Dionysus	Ariadne	Leda
Side 2	Engraving (1754)				
Side 2	Sculpture in the Louvre				

== Today ==
Plaster castings in Salonica

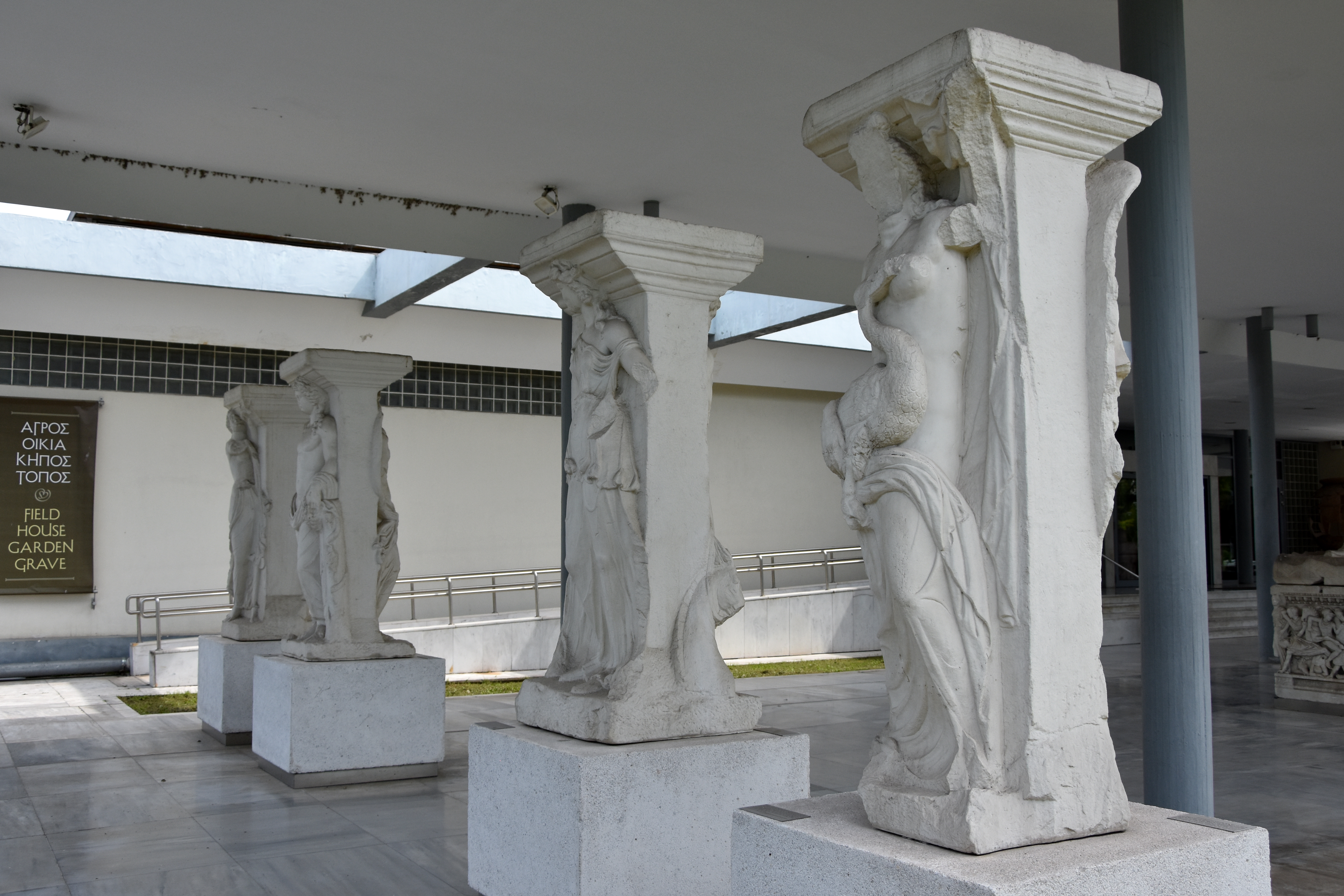
Side 1

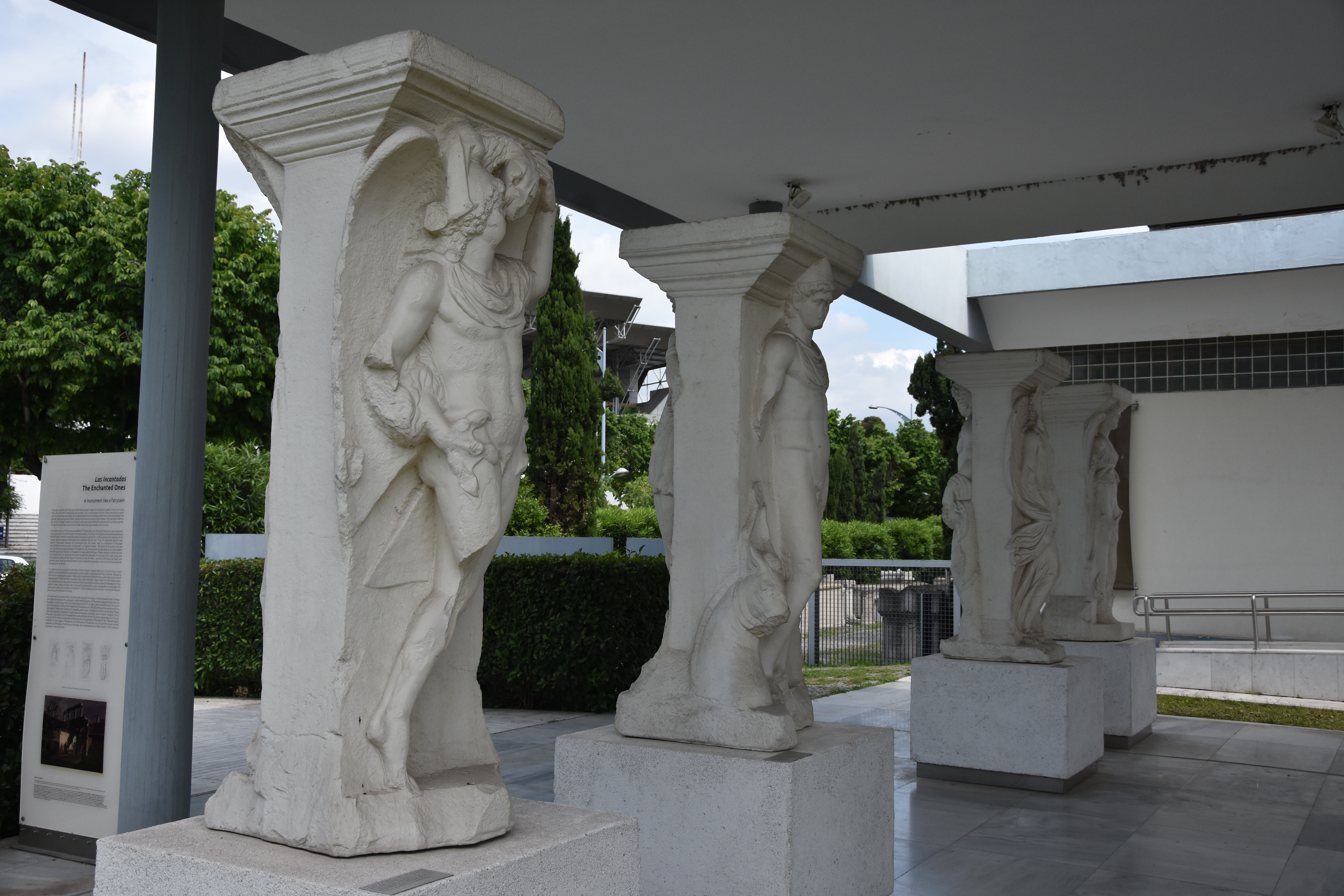
Side 2

The same year that Pillar V with the fragment with the Nike was discovered in Rogoti Street, on the occasion that that year Thessaloniki had been named as the European Capital of Culture, a request was made by the municipality of Thessaloniki to the Louvre and the French government for the return of the four sculptures to the city, but the request was not successful, and Las Incantadas were not returned. Thus, the Pillar V fragment remains the only part of Las Incantadas that still resides in the city to this day. The archaeological museum of the city exhibits said fragment next to large copies of Stuart and Revett's engravings of the other four missing pillars.

In 2015, thanks to funding from the organization of the Thessaloniki International Fair and the participation of other local bodies in Greece it became possible faithful copies of the sculptures in the Louvre to be made using molds and plaster, the final cost of which amounted to 150,000 euros. They were exhibited at the 80th Thessaloniki International Fair and then the copies were transferred two years later in 2017 to the Archaeological Museum of Thessaloniki where they have been ever since in permanent exhibition in the museum's portico. Along with the plaster castings the molds used to create them were also sent to Greece from the Louvre.

The casts in the Archaeological Museum

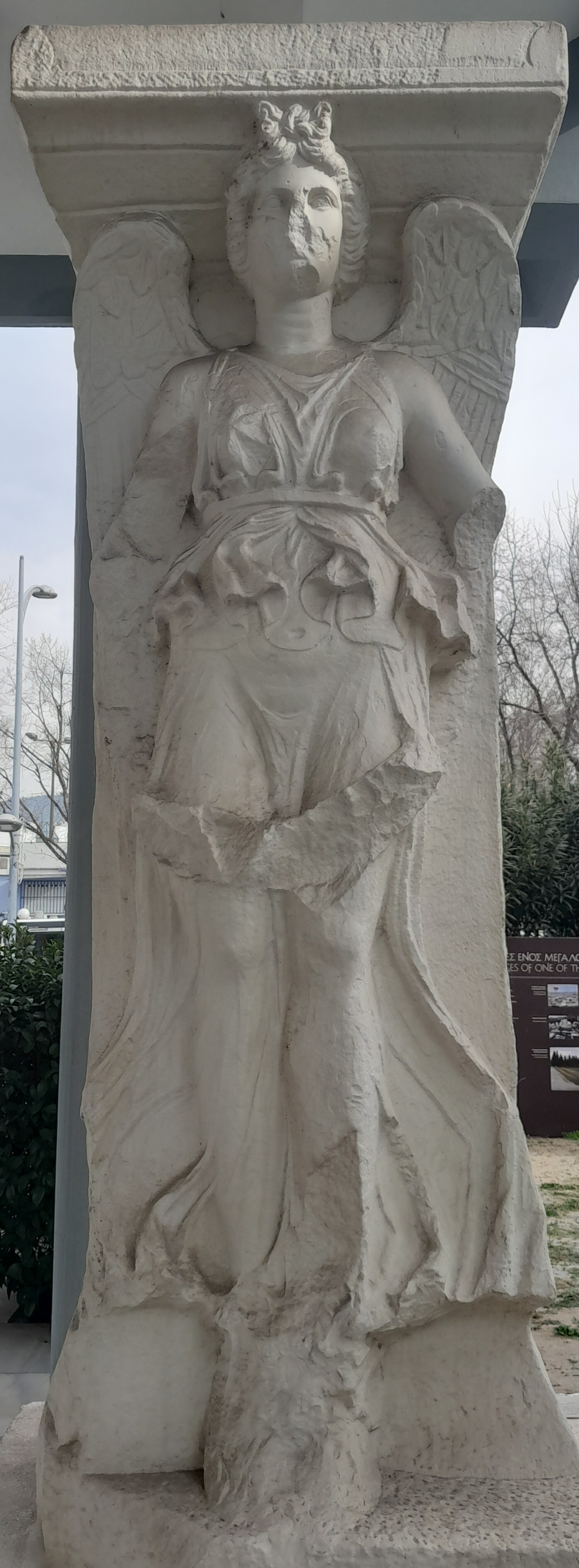
Nike

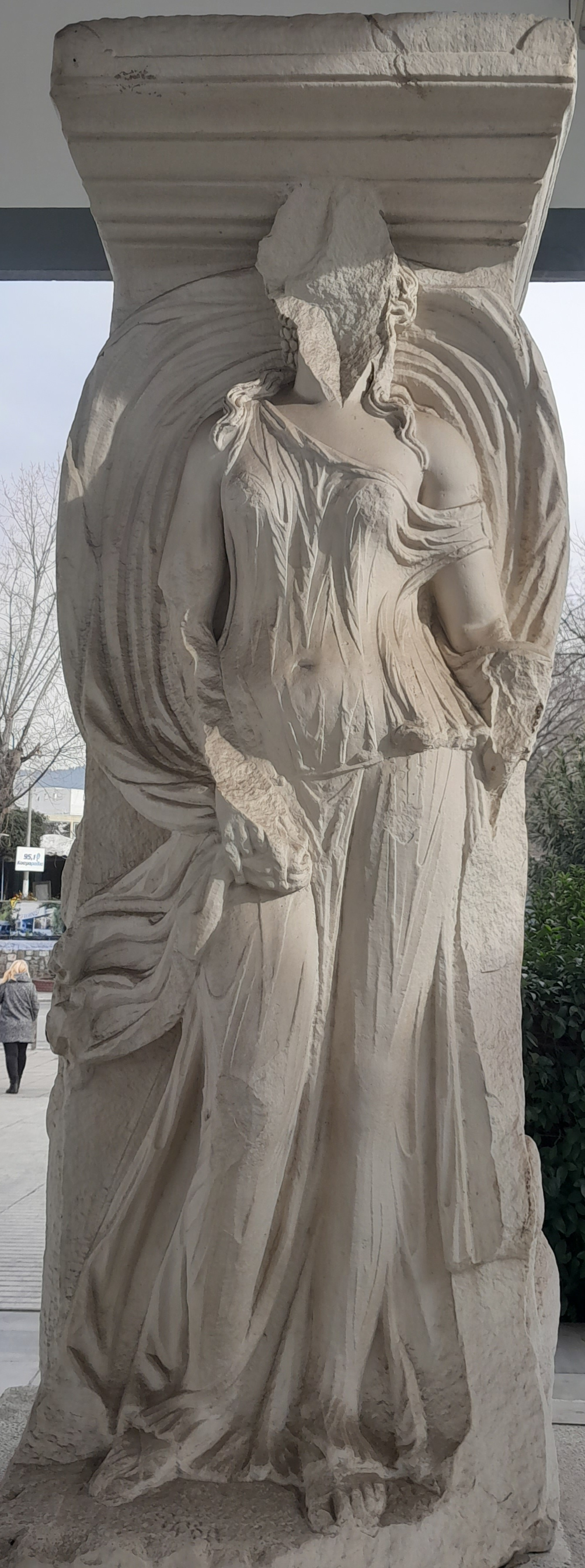
Aura

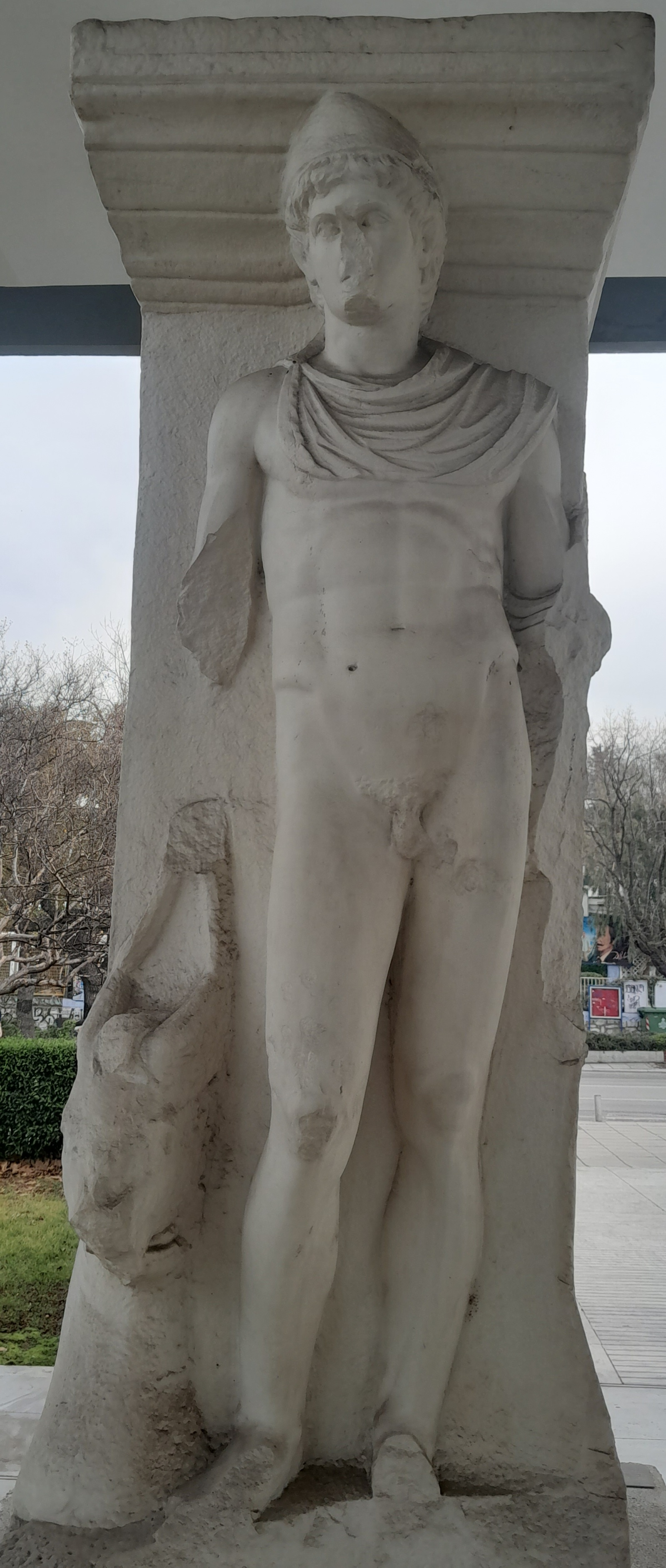
Dioscurus

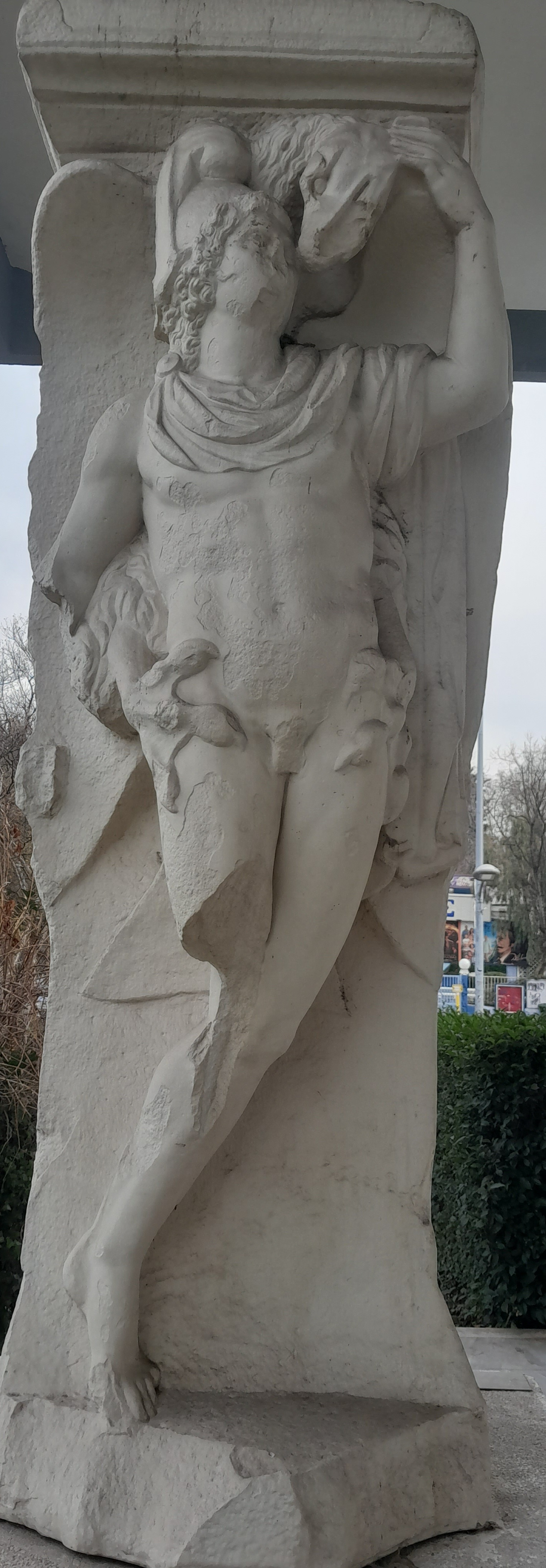
Ganymede

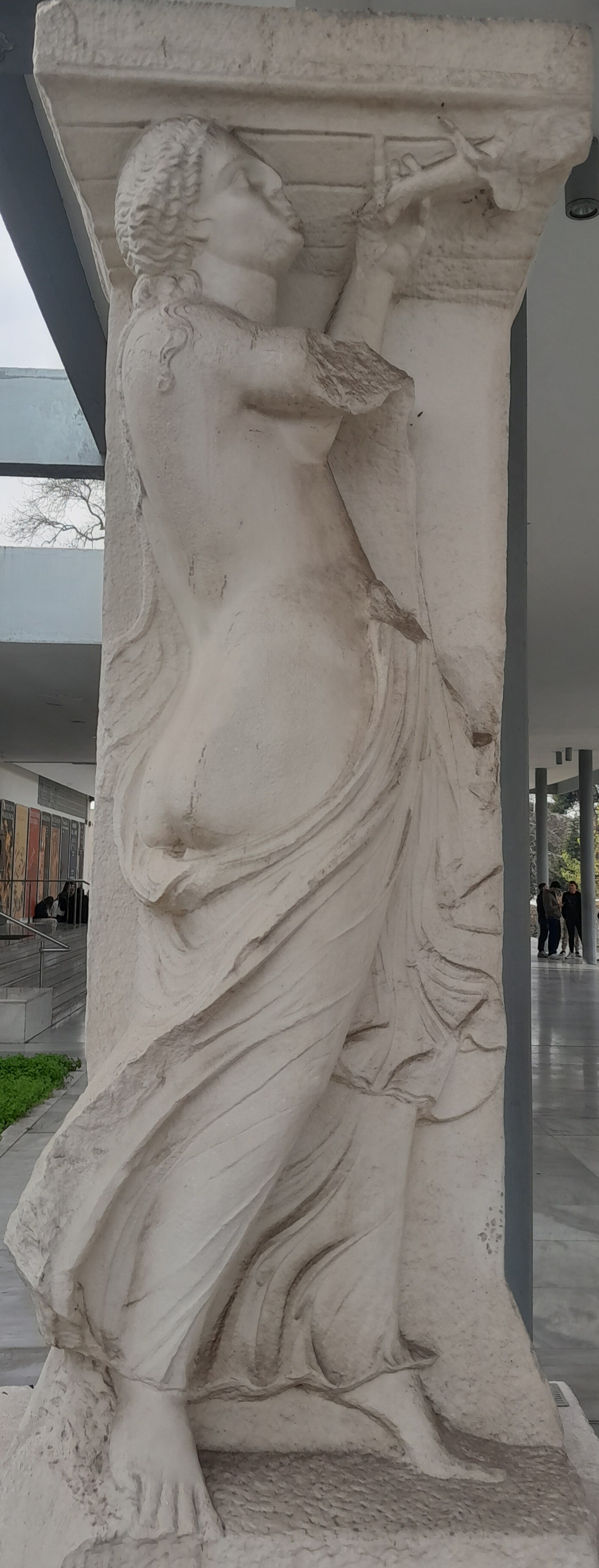
Maenad

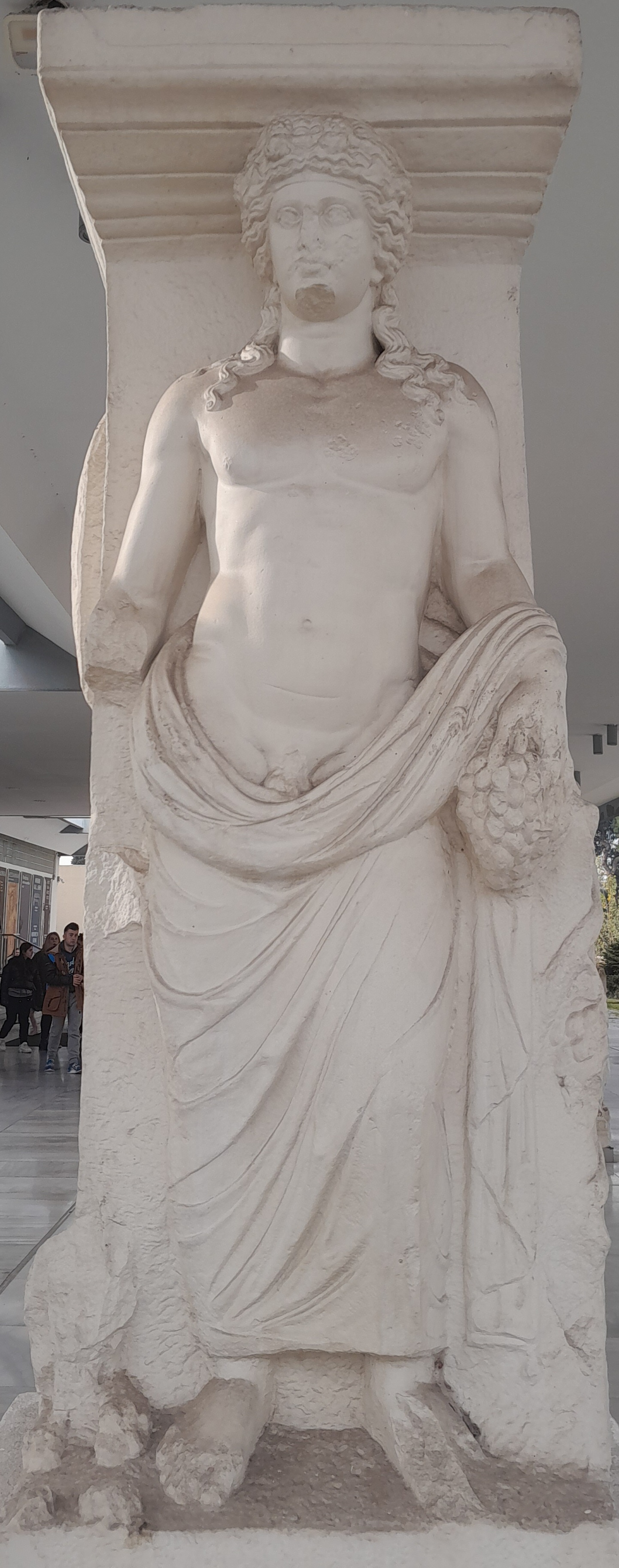
Dionysus

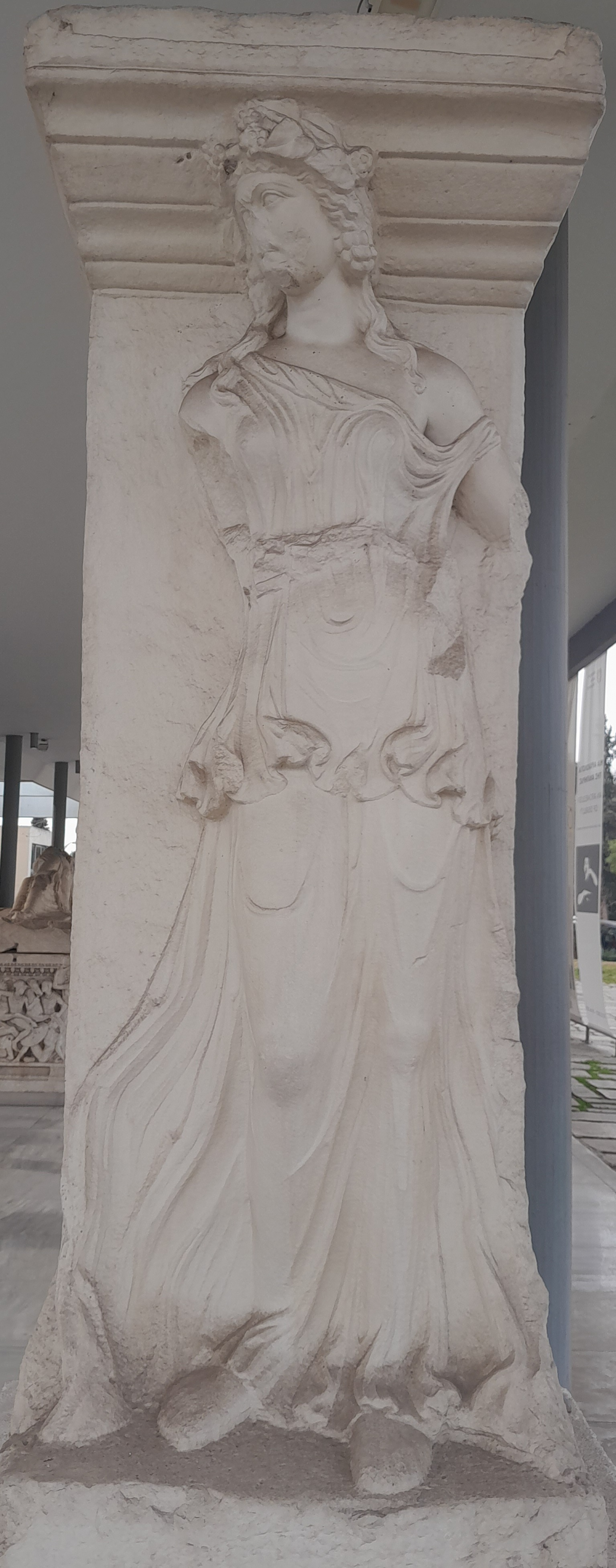
Ariadne

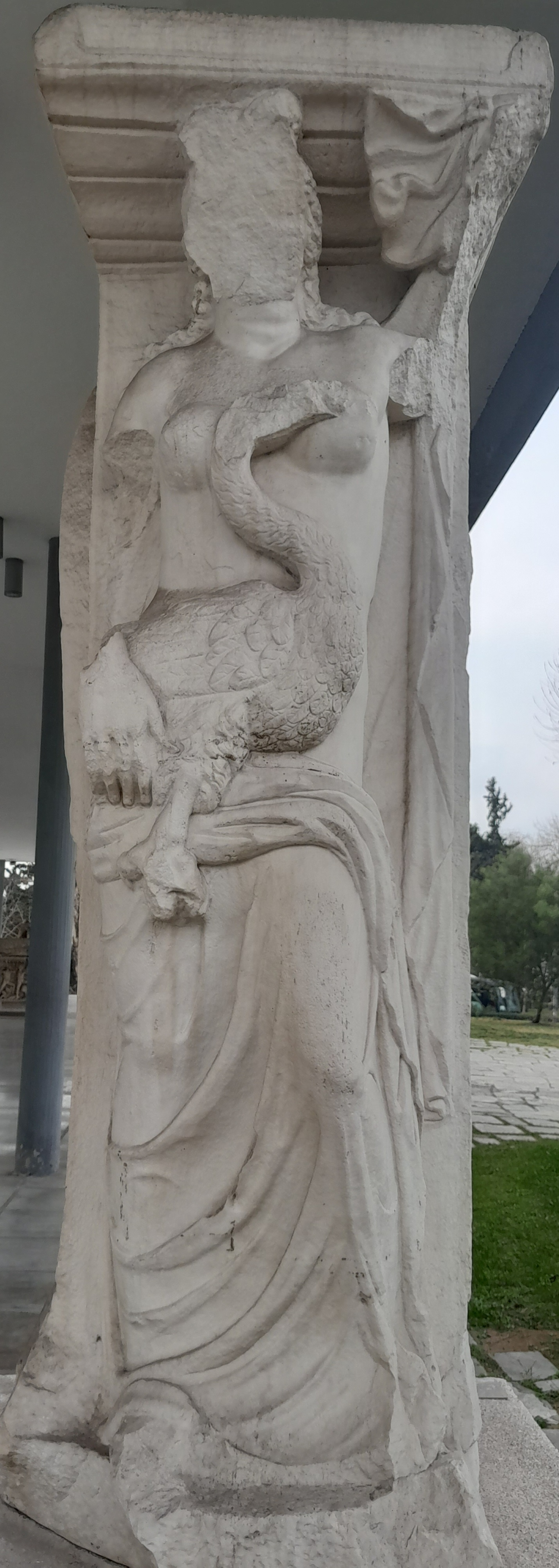
Leda

== See also ==
- Caryatids of Eleusis
- Metopes of the Parthenon
- Pergamon Altar
- Ishtar Gate
- Winged Victory of Samothrace

== Bibliography ==
- Γκαλά-Γεωργιλά, Έλλη (2011), Η ακριβής θέση των «Ενκαντάδας. Ταύτιση βάσει αρχειακών πηγών (PDF), Ελληνική Ιστορική Εταιρεία, archived from the original (PDF) on 2017-03-01
- Sève, Michel (2013). "LA COLONNADE DES INCANTADAS À THESSALONIQUE". Revue Archéologique (Nouvelle Série, Fasc. 1): 125–133. ISSN 0035-0737. JSTOR 44722261.
- Mazower, Mark (2006). Salonica, City of Ghosts: Christians, Muslims and Jews 1430-1950. Athens: Harper Collins Publications. ISBN 9780007120222.
- Βακαλόπουλος, Α. (1986). "Ένας Γάλλος Έλγιν στη Θεσσαλονίκη". Μακεδονικά. 25: 24–32. doi:10.12681/makedonika.217.
- Guerrini, L. (1961). "Las Incantadas". Enciclopedia dell' Arte Antica. Vol. 4. Roma: Istituto della Enciclopedia italiana.
- Perdrizet, Paul (1930). "L'" Incantada " de Salonique (Musée du Louvre )". Monuments et mémoires de la Fondation Eugène Piot. 31 (1): 51–90. doi:10.3406/piot.1930.1885.
- Miller, Emm. (1889). Le mont Athos. Vatopedi. L'île de Thasos. Paris. pp. 336–366.
- Papazoglou, Ares (2011). Las Incantadas: Οι "Μαγεμένες" της Θεσσαλονίκης [Las Incantadas: The "Enchanted Ones" of Salonica] (in Greek). Νησίδες. ISBN 9789609488143.
- Lioutas, Asterios (2021). "Ο Πέμπτος Πεσσός της Στοάς των Ειδώλων" [The Fifth Pillar of the Portico of the Idols]. In Esther Solomon; Styliana Galiniki (eds.). The Work of Magic Art: Ιστορία, χρήσεις & σημασίες του μνημείο των Incantadas της Θεσσαλονίκης [The Work of Magic Art: History, uses & meanings of the monuments of the Incantadas of Thessaloniki] (in Greek). Thessaloniki, Greece. ISBN 978-960-9621-44-1.
- Vitti, Massimo; Bianchi, Fulvia (2021). "Las Incantadas: Ένα Αινιγματικό Κτίριο στον Χώρο της Ρωμαϊκής Αγοράς της Θεσσαλονίκης" [Las Incantadas: An Enigmatic Building in the Area of the Roman Forum of Salonica]. In Esther Solomon; Styliana Galiniki (eds.). The Work of Magic Art: Ιστορία, χρήσεις & σημασίες του μνημείο των Incantadas της Θεσσαλονίκης [The Work of Magic Art: History, uses & meanings of the monuments of the Incantadas of Thessaloniki]. Thessaloniki, Greece. ISBN 978-960-9621-44-1.
- Stuart, J.; Revett, N. (1762). The Antiquities of Athens, Measured and Delineated. Vol. 3. London: John Nichols. pp. 53–56.

== See also ==
- Parthenon marbles, similar case of ancient sculptures taken from Greece in the 19th century
- Saint Demetra, caryatid taken from Eleusis in 1801
- Winged Victory of Samothrace
- Arch of Galerius and Rotunda
