= Lelantos =

Minor character in the Dionysiaca

Lelantos or Lelantus (Ancient Greek: Λήλαντος, romanized: Lḗlantos) is a minor mythological figure that appears in the late epic Dionysiaca by Nonnus of Panopolis, written in the early fifth century AD.

== Dionysiaca ==
Lelantos is the Titan father of the nymph Aura ("Breeze"), who was a hunting companion of Artemis and the mother, by Dionysus, of Iacchus, a minor deity connected with the Eleusinian Mysteries. Lelantos was married to the Oceanid nymph Periboea, whom Nonnus seems to imply was Aura's mother, although elsewhere, he calls Aura the "daughter of Cybele", the Phrygian mother-goddess. Lelantos's own parentage is not touched upon.

== See also ==
- Leto
- Lethe
- Sangarius

== General and cited references ==
- Bernabé and García-Gasco, "Nonnus and Dionysiac-Orphic Religion" in Brill's Companion to Nonnus of Panopolis, editor Domenico Accorinti, BRILL, 2016. ISBN 9789004310698.
- Grimal, Pierre, The Dictionary of Classical Mythology, Wiley-Blackwell, 1996, ISBN 978-0-631-20102-1.
- Nonnus, Dionysiaca; translated by Rouse, W H D, I Books I–XV. Loeb Classical Library No. 344, Cambridge, Massachusetts, Harvard University Press; London, William Heinemann Ltd. 1940. Internet Archive
- Nonnus, Dionysiaca; translated by Rouse, W H D, III Books XXXVI–XLVIII. Loeb Classical Library No. 346, Cambridge, Massachusetts, Harvard University Press; London, William Heinemann Ltd. 1940. Internet Archive
