= Aura (mythology) =

Divine personification of the breeze in Greek and Roman mythology

- Goddess of the Breeze
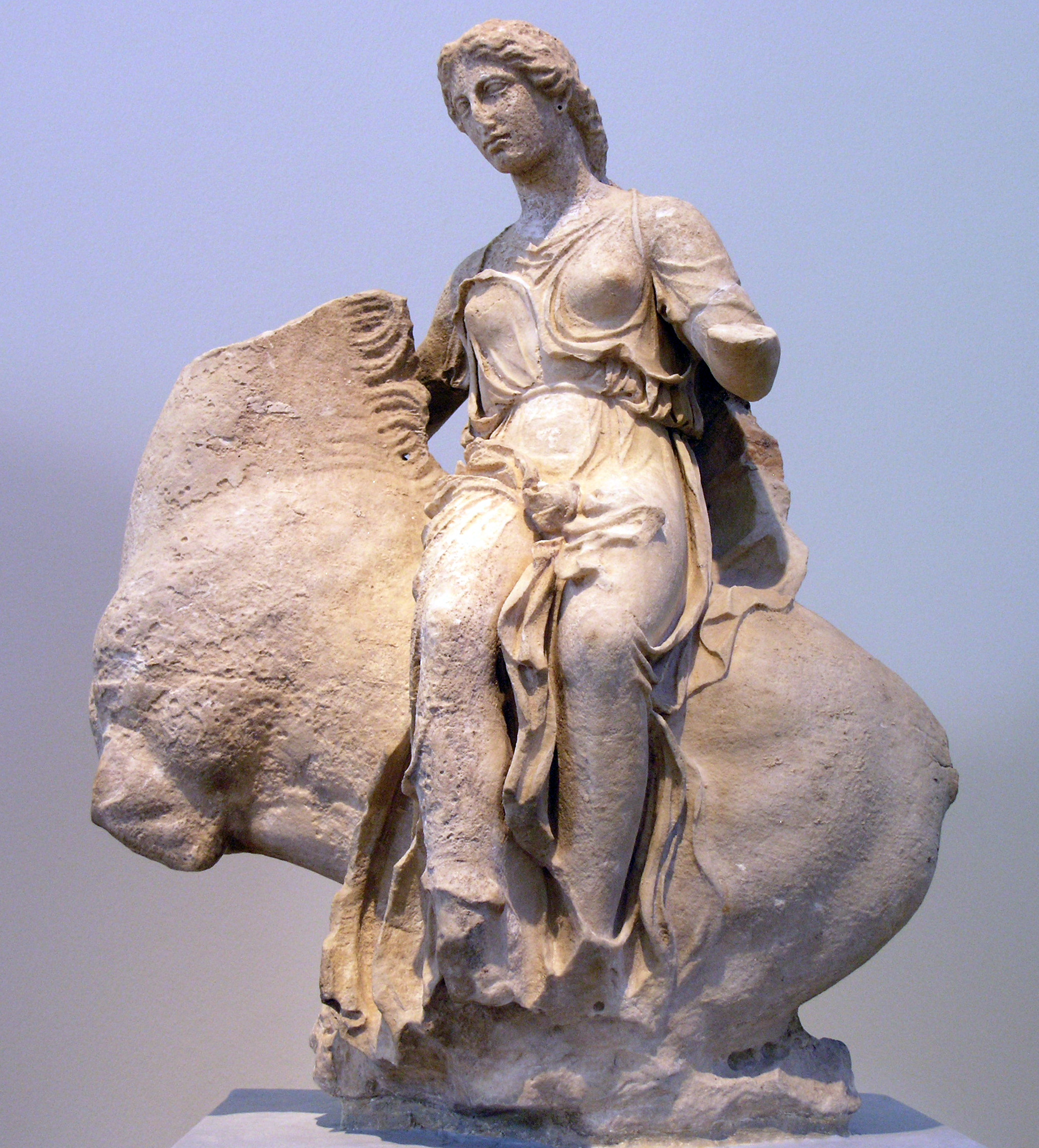
- Aura riding a horse by Timotheus, National Archaeological Museum, Athens.
- Greek: Αὔρα
- Abode: Phrygia

Genealogy
- Parents: Lelantos (father); Cybele or Periboea (mother)
- Consort: Dionysus
- Children: Iacchus, unnamed son

In Greek and Roman mythology, Aura (Ancient Greek: Αὔρα, romanized: Aúra, lit. 'breeze' pronounced [ǎu̯raː], or Αὔρη pronounced [ǎu̯rɛː]) is a minor wind goddess, whose name means "breeze". The plural form, Aurae (Ancient Greek: Αὔραι) is sometimes found to describe a group of breeze nymphs associated with Boreas, the god of the north wind.

The most detailed account of Aura's myth is recorded by late antiquity writer Nonnus, according to whom Aura is the daughter of the Titan Lelantos and the mother, by Dionysus, of Iacchus, a minor deity connected with the Eleusinian Mysteries.

== Etymology ==
The Greek noun αὔρα means "breeze, fresh air", especially cool breeze. It is cognate with the word ἀήρ, meaning air or morning mist, from an earlier Proto-Indo-European root *h₂ewsḗr.

== Family ==
The only author to offer a lineage for Aura is Nonnus, writing in the fifth century AD. In his account, Aura is the nymph daughter of the Titan Lelantos. Nonnus seems to imply that Aura's mother was the wife of Lelantos, the Oceanid nymph Periboea, although elsewhere, he calls Aura the "daughter of Cybele", the Phrygian mother-goddess.

Quintus Smyrnaeus on the other hand made the breeze nymphs Aurae the daughters of Boreas, the god of the north wind.

== Mythology ==
=== Ovid ===
The Augustan poet Ovid, in the Ars Amatoria and again in the Metamorphoses, introduces Aura into the tragic story of Cephalus and Procris, perhaps playing on the verbal similarity of Aura and Aurora, the Roman goddess of the dawn (equivalent of Greek Eos), who had briefly been Cephalus's lover before he returned to his wife.

In the Metamorphoses, Ovid has Cephalus tell how it was his habit, that after finishing a hunt, he would seek out the cooling breeze, and call upon it to soothe his body and refresh him. Cephalus referred to the breeze as his greatest joy. But someone overheard Cephalus' words and misinterpreted them, thinking Aura was surely some nymph Cephalus was having an affair with.

That person reported back to Cephalus' wife Procris, she was stricken with grief and fear over a false alarm (again implying that Procris was afraid Cephalus had returned to Aurora). The next day Cephalus went hunting again, and when he heard the rustle of leaves, he threw hurled his javelin against the animal, only to discover that it was Procris, who had come to spy on her husband, suspicious that he was seeing Aura again. With her dying breath Procris begged him not to replace her with Aura, as Cephalus assured her this was but a misunderstanding.

=== Nonnus ===
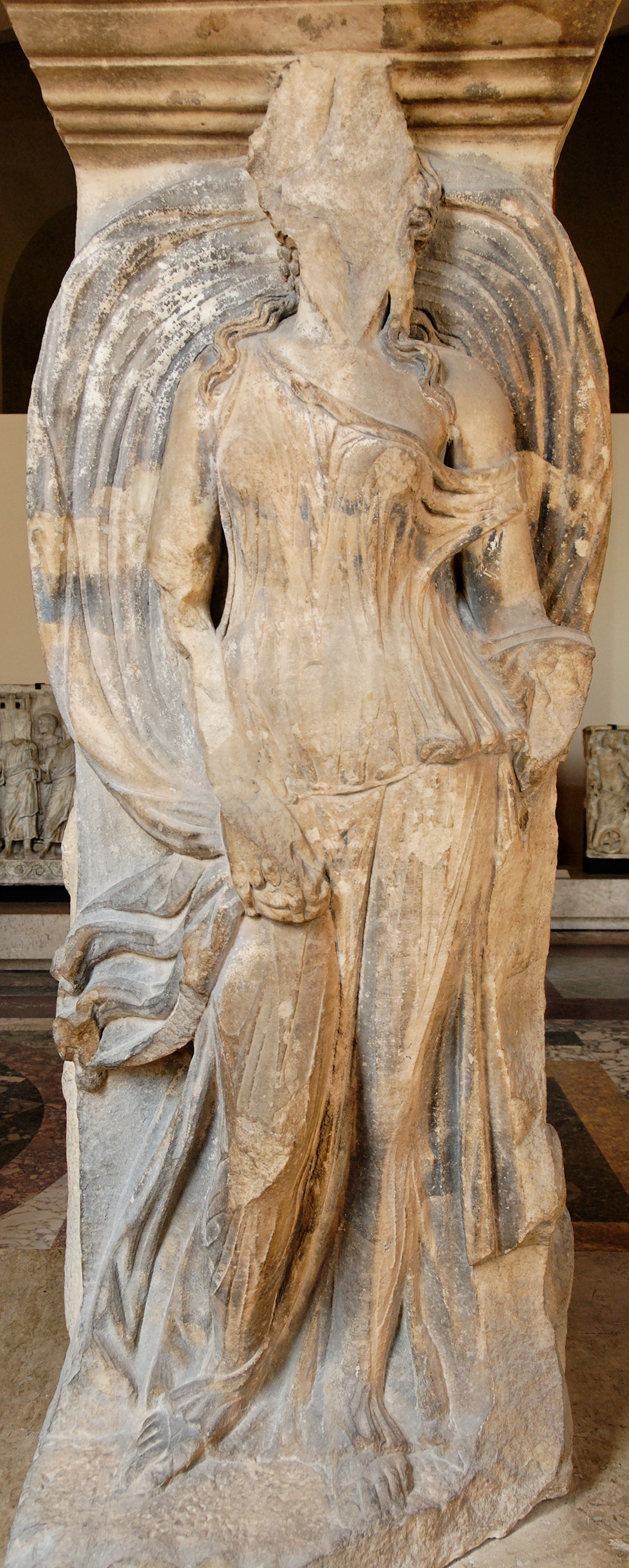
A velificans, perhaps Aura, Las Incantadas from the agora of Thessalonica (first half of the second century AD), Paris, Louvre MA 1393.

Nonnus' tells the story of the rape of Aura, by Dionysus, in the final book of his epic poem the Dionysiaca (early 5th century).

Aura was a resident of Phrygia and companion of the goddess Artemis, who presided over hunters and the woods. Nonnus describes Aura as a tall nymph as fast as the wind, and a "manlike" virgin who knew nothing of Aphrodite. Aura was a huntress, who could run down wild bears and lions, but did not bother with small game.

One day, Aura goes hunting with Artemis. For relief from the midday heat, the hunting party stops for a swim. Aura then teases Artemis, saying that her breasts were better than Artemis's, since hers were small and round like a man's, while Artemis's were large and voluptuous like a woman's, and so belied Artemis' supposed "unviolated maidenhood". Deeply offended, the angry Artemis goes to Nemesis, the goddess of divine retribution, who arranges for Aura to be punished by losing her virginity. Dionysus is then made mad with desire for Aura, by an arrow from the bow of Eros on Nemesis's orders. But knowing that he will never be able to seduce the obdurately virginal Aura, Dionysus drugs Aura with wine, ties her up, and rapes her while she is unconscious and unmoving.

When Aura awakes, discovering she is no longer a virgin, but not knowing who is responsible, enraged, she "made empty the huts of the mountainranging herdsmen and drenched the hills with blood". After a painful labor, Aura gives birth to twin boys. She gives them to a lioness to eat, but it refuses to do so. So Aura seizes one of the boys, flings it high into the air, and after it falls back to hit the ground, she eats it. However, Artemis spirits the other child safely away. Aura then drowns herself in the river Sangarios, where Zeus turned her into a spring:

her breasts became the spouts of falling water, the stream was her body, the flowers her hair, her bow the horn of the horned River in bull-shape, the bowstring changed into a rush and the whistling arrows into vocal reeds, the quiver passed through to the muddy bed of the river and, changed to a hollow channel, poured its sounding waters.

According to Nonnus, Aura's surviving child by Dionysus, is Iacchus, a minor deity connected with the Eleusinian Mysteries, although other accounts have Iacchus, when not identified with Dionysus himself, the son of Demeter or Persephone.

=== Others ===
The only other account of Aura's rape is recounted in the twelfth-century lexicon Etymologicum Magnum, according to which Aura was a maiden from Pontus who hunted with Artemis. Dionysus saw her and raped her, after which Artemis threatened to kick her out of her company. In fear, Aura fled to the town of Cyzicus in Phrygia, where she gave birth to twins (whose gender, names and identities are not revealed). Thus the mountain nearby got its name, 'Dindymon' ("twin"), after Aura's children.

== Ancient culture ==
Aurae was the title of a now lost play by the Athenian comic poet Metagenes, who was contemporary with Aristophanes, Phrynichus, and Plato.

== Iconography ==
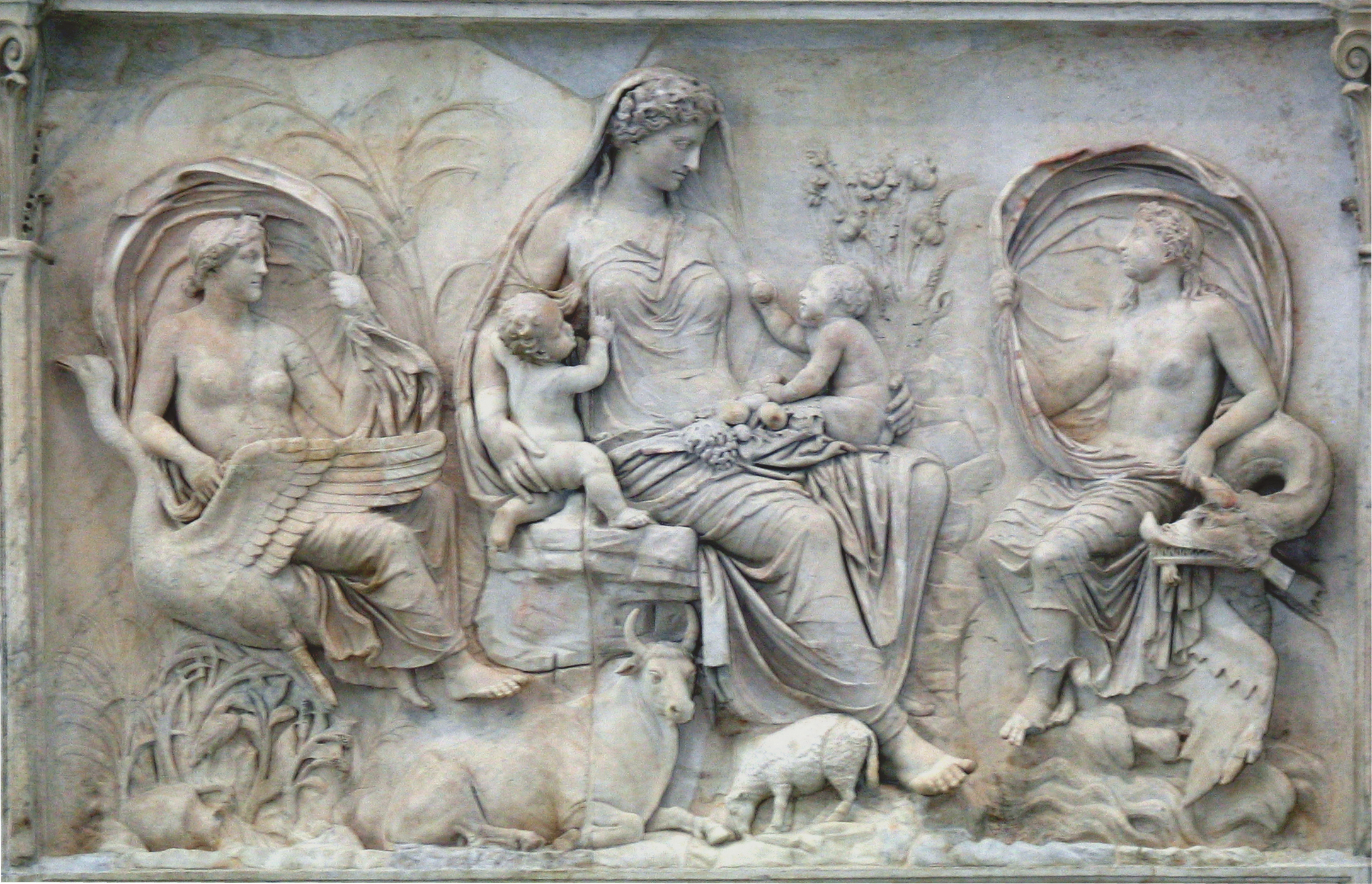
A pair of velificantes – possibly Aurae – on the Ara Pacis (late 1st century BC). Between them is Tellus Mater.

Extant images of Aura from antiquity are rare. There are only two which can be identified as Aura by inscription. The oldest is a fifth-century BC skyphos from Taranto, now in the Nicholson Museum, University of Sydney (53.30), which shows a figure labeled "Aura", seated on a rock by the sea, with velificatio, a billowing garment that forms an arch overhead. The other is found on a volute-krater funerary vase (c. 370–350 BC), now in the British Museum (F277). Depicted on its neck is a polos-crowned head with curls, and the inscription "Aura" above the polos crown.

Aura is possibly the velificans depicted on Side 1 of the second pillar of Las Incantadas, a Roman pillared portico bearing mythological reliefs from the agora of Thessalonica, which was demolished by Frenchman Emmanuel Miller and its sculptures transferred to the Louvre. She is depicted in a 'slow walking' pose, slightly bending and lifting her right leg off the ground, while placing all of her weight on her left leg (contrapposto). She wears a thin wet-looking chiton, and her hair falls softly to her shoulders. Aura's face is entirely gone, as is her left and most of her right forearm. That figure has also been identified as a Bacchante, or even Helen of Troy. On the other side of Aura's pillar stands Dionysus.

Pliny describes two statues of Aurae with velificantes sua veste, "spreading their cloaks like sails", at the Porticus Octaviae in Rome. Influenced by Pliny's description, a pair of velificantes (figures framed by a velificatio) that appear on the Ara Pacis Augustae ("Altar of Augustan Peace") have often been identified as Aurae, although this identification has been criticized, and many other identifications have been proposed.

Aurae can resemble Nereids, from whom they are distinguishable mainly by the absence of marine imagery. The female figures with wind-blown drapery, which adorned the Nereid Monument at Xanthos, though usually identified as Nereids, have sometimes been identified as Aurae.

Aura is sometimes identified as the female figure carried by Zephyrus in Sandro Botticelli's painting The Birth of Venus.

== See also ==
- Metamorphoses in Greek mythology
- Nicaea
- Greco-Roman mysteries
- Chione
