= Iacchus =

Minor deity in connection with the Eleusinian mysteries

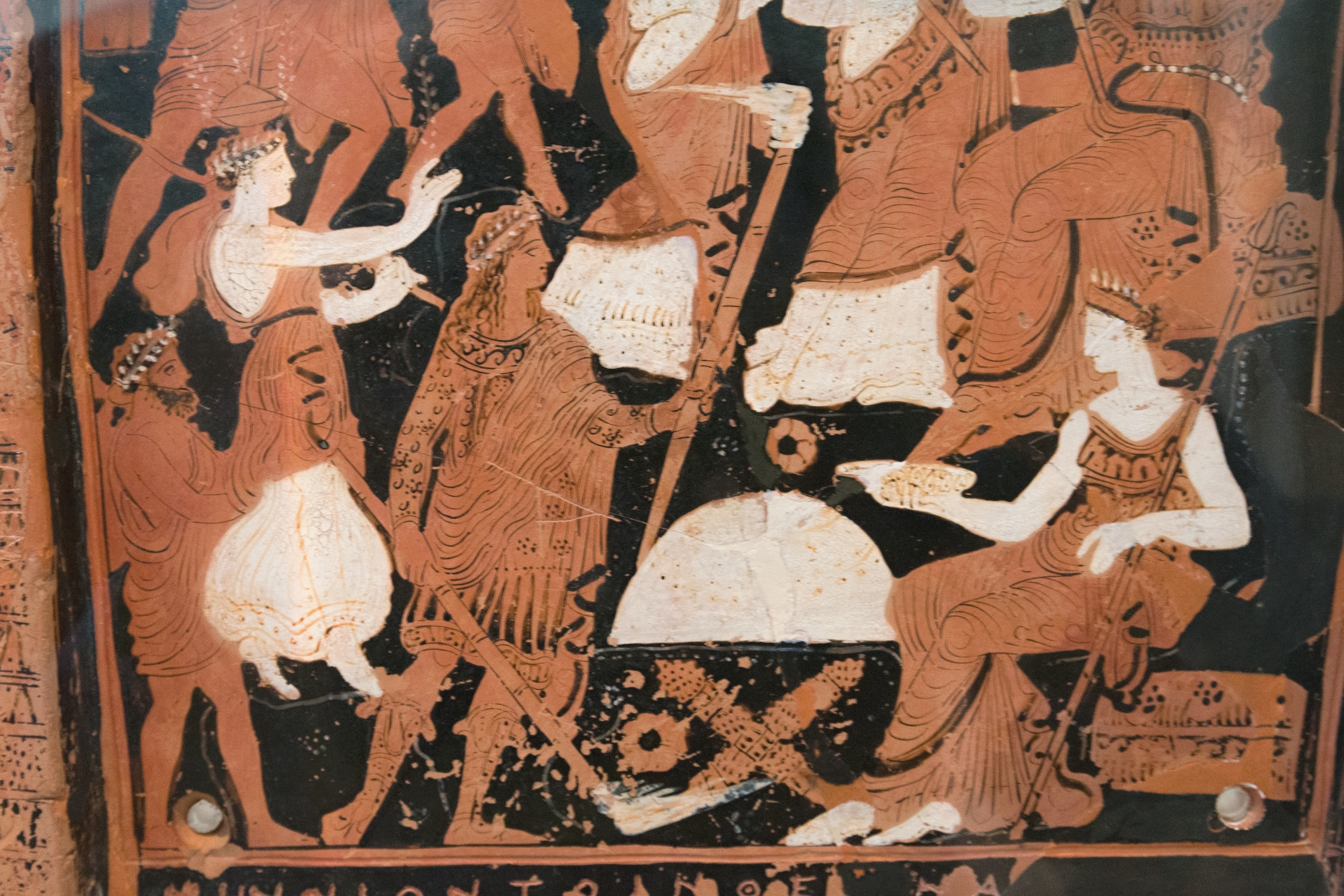
Iacchus (?), with a torch in each hand, on the Ninnion Tablet, 350s BC, National Archaeological Museum of Athens 11036.

In ancient Greek religion and mythology, Iacchus (also Iacchos, Iakchos) (Ancient Greek: Ἴακχος) was a minor deity, of some cultic importance, particularly at Athens and Eleusis in connection with the Eleusinian Mysteries, but without any significant mythology. He perhaps originated as the personification of the ritual exclamation Iacche! cried out during the Eleusinian procession from Athens to Eleusis. He was often identified with Dionysus, perhaps because of the resemblance of the names Iacchus and Bacchus, another name for Dionysus. By various accounts he was a son of Demeter (or apparently her husband), or a son of Persephone, identical with Dionysus Zagreus, or a son of Dionysus.

During the Greco-Persian Wars, when the Attic countryside, deserted by the Greeks, was being laid waste by the Persians, a ghostly procession was supposed to have been seen advancing from Eleusis, crying out “Iacchus”. This miraculous event was interpreted as a sign of the eventual Greek victory at the Battle of Salamis (480 BC). Iacchus was also possibly involved in an Eleusinian myth in which the old woman Baubo, by exposing her genitals, cheered up the mourning Demeter.

== Cult ==
Iacchus was one of the deities, along with Demeter and Kore (Persephone), worshipped as part of the Eleusinian Mysteries. The late 1st-century BC geographer Strabo called him the ἀρχηγέτην ("leader-in-chief" or "founder") "of the mysteries".

=== Statue, temple, and feast day ===
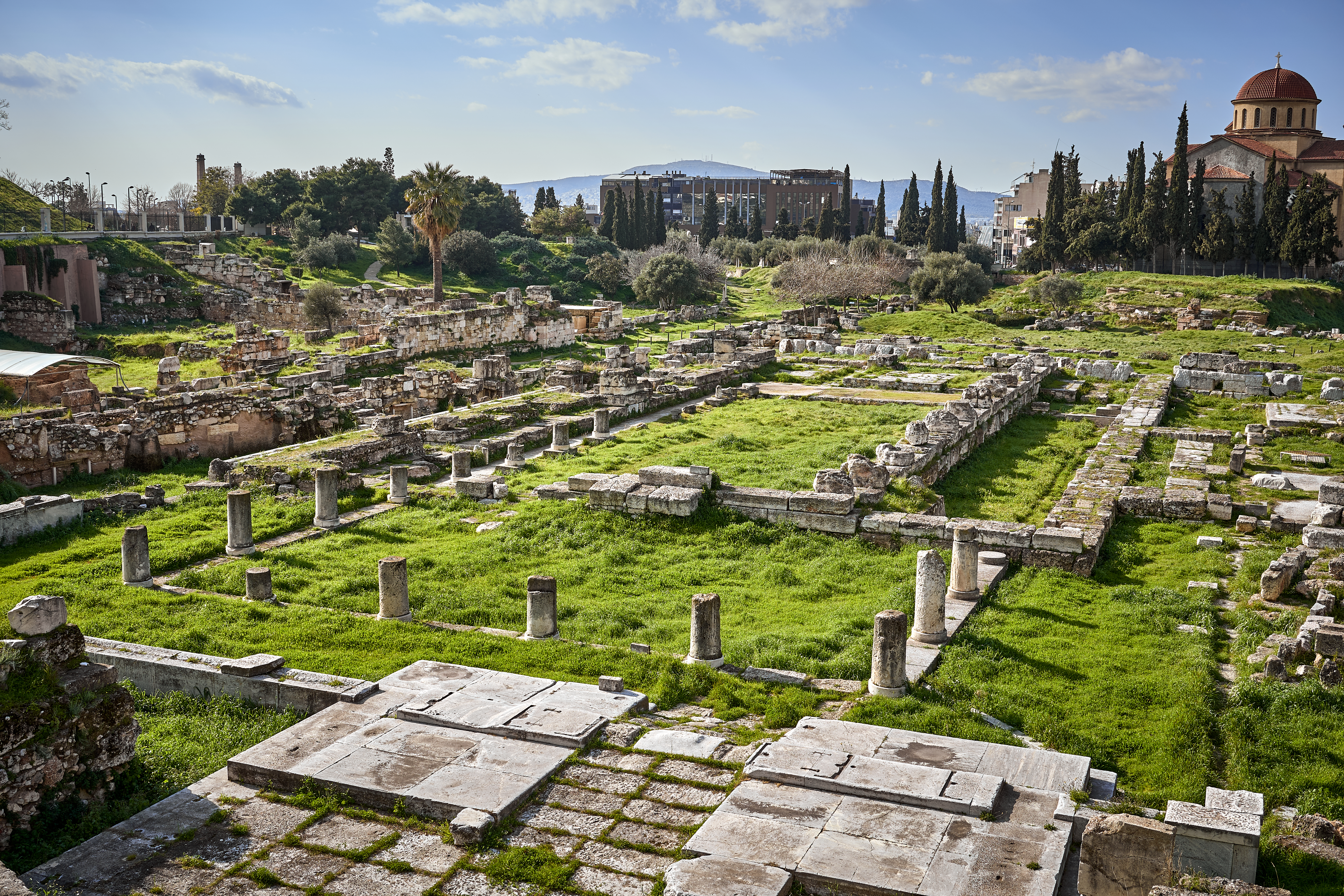
The ruins of the Pompeion

There was a statue of Iacchus kept in a temple at Athens. According to the 2nd-century AD geographer Pausanias, the statue held a torch and was by the Athenian sculptor Praxiteles. A passage from Aristophanes' The Frogs (405 BC) suggests it wore a crown of myrtle. According to Pausanias, the statue was kept in a temple of Demeter located near the Dipylon gate, the main entrance to ancient Athens. The temple was perhaps the one that Plutarch referred to as the "so called Iaccheion". Nearby was the Pompeion, the building which was the assembly point for the procession celebrating the Eleusinian Mysteries. According to the 10th-century Byzantine encyclopedia the Suda, Iacchus was also the name of his "feast" day, presumably the day that Iacchus was carried to Eleusis as part of the Eleusinian procession.

=== Eleusinian procession ===
Iacchus and his statue played an important part in the Eleusinian procession. Plutarch referred to the procession as ἐξαγόντων Ἴακχον (“leading out Iacchus”). On 19 Boedromion (probably), the statue of Iacchus was taken from its temple and carried as part of the procession of the participants in the Mysteries who walked from Athens to Eleusis, arriving on 20 Boedromion (corresponding to the 28th or 29 September). Along the way, the participants in the procession would cry out the cultic exclamation, Iacche!

There was a special official associated with Iacchus and his statue called the Ἰακχαγωγός ('leader/bearer of Iacchus'), whose function presumably was to carry or accompany the statue of Iacchus during the procession. The Ἰακχαγωγός is listed as one of the Eleusinian officials receiving an endowment (c. 160–170 AD), appears in a list of Eleusinian priests given by the 2nd-century AD Julius Pollux, and had a reserved seat in the prohedria ("seats in front") of the Theater of Dionysus at Athens. An incumbent of the office (126/7 AD) is mentioned on four dedications.

A parody of the Eleusinian procession appears in Aristophanes' comedy The Frogs, set in Hades (the underworld). There a chorus of dead mystics, singing and dancing in procession, chant their "hymn to Iacchus": "O Iacchus, Iacchus O!", and sing,

Iacchus, here abiding in temples most reverend,
Iacchus, O Iacchus,
come to dance in this meadow;
to your holy mystic bands
Shake the leafy crown
around your head, brimming
with myrtle,
Boldly stomp your feet in time
to the wild fun-loving rite,
with full share of the Graces, the holy dance, sacred
to your mystics.

and,

Awake, for it has come tossing torches in hand,
Iacchos, Oh Iacchos,
the light-bringing star of our nocturnal rite.
Now the meadow brightly burns
Old men's knees start to sway.
They shake away their pains
and the long cycles of ancient years
Through your holy rite.
Beaming with your torch,
lead forth to the flowering stretch of marsh
the youth that makes your choruses, o blessed one!

and,

Now then
Summon the god of the hour with your songs
the partner of this dance of ours.
Iacchus, honored by all, deviser of our festal song
most sweet, follow us here
to the goddess and show us how
you travel a long road with ease.
Iacchus, lover of the dance, lead me onward,

=== The Lenaea ===
Iacchus also played a role in the Lenaia, the winter Athenian festival of Dionysus. According to the scholiast on the Frogs of Aristophanes, participants at the Lenaia responded to the command to "Invoke the god" with the invocation, "Hail, Iacchos, son of Semele, thou giver of wealth." According to the scholiast, the command to call on the god was proclaimed by the Daduchos, a high Eleusinian official

=== At Delphi? ===
The name Iacchus—identified with Dionysus—was also possibly associated with cultic ritual at Delphi. Sophocles' Antigone, referring to nocturnal rites occurring on Mount Parnassus above Delphi, contains the invocation:

O Leader of the chorus of the stars whose breath is fire, overseer of the chants in the night, son begotten of Zeus, appear, my king, with your attendant Thyiads, who in night-long frenzy dance and sing you as Iacchus the Giver!

== Name and origin ==
Iacchus seems to have originated as the personification of the cultic exclamation, Iacche, cried out by participants during the Eleusinian procession, with the exclamation itself, having apparently derived from ιαχή ("cry"), ιάχω ("to cry"). It has been suggested that the cry "iacche’’ over time came to be interpreted as the vocative form of a name "Iacchus". In addition to being the cultic cry, "iacchus" was also a term for a kind of song or hymn of worship, possibly unassociated with the god.

== Identification with Dionysus ==
Iacchus is associated with Dionysus at least as early as the 5th century BC. The association may have arisen because of the homophony of the names Iacchus and Bacchus, one of the names of Dionysus. Two black-figure lekythoi (c. 500 BC) may represent the earliest evidence for such an association. The nearly-identical vases, one in Berlin and the other in Rome, depict Dionysus along with the inscription IAKXNE, a possible miswriting of IAKXE.

More certain early evidence can be found in the works of the 5th-century BC Athenian tragedians Sophocles and Euripides. In Sophocles' Antigone (c. 441 BC), an ode to Dionysus begins by addressing Dionysus as the "God of many names" (πολυώνυμε), who rules over the glens of Demeter's Eleusis, and ends by identifying him with "Iacchus the Giver", who leads "the chorus of the stars whose breath is fire" and whose "attendant Thyiads" dance in "night-long frenzy". And in a fragment from a lost play, Sophocles describes Nysa, Dionysus' traditional place of nurture: "From here I caught sight of Nysa, haunt of Bacchus, famed among mortals, which Iacchus of the bull's horns counts as his beloved nurse". In Euripides' Bacchae (c. 405 BC), a messenger, describing the Bacchic revelries on mount Cithaeron, associates Iacchus with Bromius, another of the names of Dionysus, saying, they "began to wave the thyrsos ... calling on Iacchus, the son of Zeus, Bromius, with united voice."

An inscription found on a stone stele (c. 340 BC), found at Delphi, contains a paean to Dionysus, which describes the travels of Dionysus to various locations in Greece where he was honored. From Thebes, where he was born, he first went to Delphi where he displayed his "starry body", and with "Delphian girls" took his "place on the folds of Parnassus", then next to Eleusis, where he is called "Iacchus":

And in your hand brandishing your night-
lighting flame, with god-possessed frenzy
you went to the vales of Eleusis
...
where the whole people of Hellas'
land, alongside your own native witnesses
of the holy mysteries, calls upon you
as Iacchus: for mortals from their pains
you have opened a haven without toils.

Strabo says that Greeks "give the name 'Iacchus' not only to Dionysus but also to the leader-in-chief of the mysteries". For the identification of Iacchus with Dionysus in an Orphic context see Orphic Hymn 42.4, 49.3.

=== Dionysus Zagreus ===
In particular Iacchus was identified with Dionysus Zagreus, who was a son of Zeus and Persephone. This Orphic Dionysus was, as an infant, attacked and dismembered by the Titans, but later reborn as Dionysus, the wine-god son of Zeus and Semele, the daughter of Cadmus, the first king of Thebes. As noted above, Sophocles mentions "Iacchus of the bull's horns", and according to the 1st-century BC historian Diodorus Siculus, it was this older Dionysus who was represented in painting and sculpture with horns, because he “excelled in sagacity and was the first to attempt the yoking of oxen and by their aid to effect the sowing of the seed”. Arrian, the 2nd-century Greek historian, wrote that it was to this Dionysus, the son of Zeus and Persephone, "not the Theban Dionysus, that the mystic chant ‘Iacchus’ is sung". And the 2nd-century poet Lucian refers to the "dismemberment of Iacchus".

=== Nonnus ===
The 4th- or 5th-century poet Nonnus, associates the name Iacchus with a "third" Dionysus. He describes the Athenian celebrations given to the first Dionysus Zagreus son of Persephone, the second Dionysus Bromios son of Semele, and the third Dionysus Iacchus:

They [the Athenians] honoured him as a god next after the son of Persephoneia, and after Semele's son; they established sacrifices for Dionysos late born and Dionysos first born, and third they chanted a new hymn for Iacchos. In these three celebrations Athens held high revel; in the dance lately made, the Athenians beat the step in honour of Zagreus and Bromios and Iacchos all together.

== Herodotus' "Iacchus" ==
Possibly the oldest testimony related to Iacchus, is given by the 5th-century Greek historian Herodotus. According to Herodotus, Dicaeus an Athenian exile told the story that, he and the former Spartan king Demaratus, who had become an advisor to the Persian king Xerxes I, witnessed a miraculous event which Dicaeus interpreted as predicting the defeat of the Persian fleet at the Battle of Salamis (480 BC), during the Greco-Persian Wars:

Dicaeus son of Theocydes, an Athenian exile who had become important among the Medes, said that at the time when the land of Attica was being laid waste by Xerxes' army and there were no Athenians in the country, he was with Demaratus the Lacedaemonian on the Thriasian plain and saw advancing from Eleusis a cloud of dust as if raised by the feet of about thirty thousand men. They marvelled at what men might be raising such a cloud of dust and immediately heard a cry. The cry seemed to be the “Iacchus” of the mysteries, and when Demaratus, ignorant of the rites of Eleusis, asked him what was making this sound, Dicaeus said, “Demaratus, there is no way that some great disaster will not befall the king's army. Since Attica is deserted, it is obvious that this voice is divine and comes from Eleusis to help the Athenians and their allies. If it descends upon the Peloponnese, the king himself and his army on the mainland will be endangered. If, however, it turns towards the ships at Salamis, the king will be in danger of losing his fleet. Every year the Athenians observe this festival for the Mother and the Maiden, and any Athenian or other Hellene who wishes is initiated. The voice which you hear is the ‘Iacchus’ they cry at this festival.” To this Demaratus replied, “Keep silent and tell this to no one else. If these words of yours are reported to the king, you will lose your head, and neither I nor any other man will be able to save you, so be silent. The gods will see to the army.” Thus he advised, and after the dust and the cry came a cloud, which rose aloft and floated away towards Salamis to the camp of the Hellenes. In this way they understood that Xerxes' fleet was going to be destroyed. Dicaeus son of Theocydes used to say this, appealing to Demaratus and others as witnesses.

However, while the "cloud of dust" and the ritual cry "Iacchus" are apparent references to the Eleusinian procession, no explicit reference is made by Herodotus to Iacchus' statue, nor in fact to the god himself— either here or elsewhere. Some scholars have taken this passage as evidence that, for Herodotus, Iacchus was not yet a god. This story, associating Iacchus with such an important Greek victory, presumably led to an increase in his fame, popularity and importance throughout Greece, and so conceivably, helped to establish Iacchus as a god.

== Genealogy ==
Iacchus, when identified with Dionysus, as he was at the Lenaia in Athens (see above), was considered to be the son of Zeus and Semele, and when identified with Dionysus Zagreus, was considered to be the son of Zeus and Persephone. However, several sources associate Iacchus (or Dionysus/Iacchus) with Demeter, either explicitly or implicitly, as her son. The earliest such source, a 4th-century BC vase fragment at Oxford, shows Demeter holding the child Dionysus on her lap. Diodorus Siculus tells us about a "second Dionysus" (i.e. Dionysus Zagreus) who "the writers of myths relate, was born to Zeus by Persephonê, though some say it was Demeter". By the 1st-century BC, Demeter suckling Iacchus had become such a commonplace, that the Latin poet Lucretius could use it as an apparently recognizable example of a lover's euphemism. A scholiast on the 2nd-century AD Aristides, explicitly names Demeter as Iacchus' mother.

By other accounts apparently, Iacchus was the husband of Demeter. And according to Nonnus, Iacchus was the son of Dionysus and the nymph Aura, who was the daughter of the Titan Lelantos and the Oceanid Periboia (or Cybele?).

== The anasyrma of Baubo ==
Iacchus was possibly involved in an Eleusinian myth concerning Demeter. Following the abduction by Hades of her daughter Persephone, Demeter visits Eleusis. Because she is in mourning for her lost daughter, Demeter refuses the offered hospitality of her Eleusinian hosts. Nevertheless, she is somehow made to laugh, and breaking her fast, finally accepts the offered food and drink. There are two versions of the story. In the earliest version, given in the Homeric Hymn to Demeter, an old servant woman Iambe makes Demeter laugh by telling her obscene jokes. In an apparent later Orphic version of the story, the old woman Baubo makes Demeter laugh by lifting her skirts (an anasyrma) thereby exposing her genitals. One account of this second version, suggests the possible involvement of Iacchus. The 2nd-century Christian apologist Clement of Alexandria, in giving an account of this story, attributes the following lines of verse to Orpheus:

This said, she drew aside her robes, and showed
A sight of shame; child Iacchus was there,
And laughing, plunged his hand below her breasts.
Then smiled the goddess, in her heart she smiled,
And drank the draught from out the glancing cup.
