= Roman Forum (disambiguation) =

The Roman Forum is the ancient center of Rome, Italy.

Roman Forum may also refer to similar structures in these other cities:

- Roman Forum, Beirut, Lebanon
- Roman Forum (Mérida), Spain, in the Roman city of Emerita Augusta
- Roman forum of Philippopolis, Plovdiv, Bulgaria
- Colonial forum of Tarraco, Tarragona, Catalonia, Spain
- Provincial forum of Tarraco, Tarragona, Catalonia, Spain
- Roman Forum (Thessaloniki), Greece
- Forum Romanum (painting), an 1826 painting by J. M. W. Turner

== See also ==
- Roman Agora, a similar structure in Athens, Greece
- The Roman Forum, a monthly magazine in Rome
