= Library of Philippopolis =

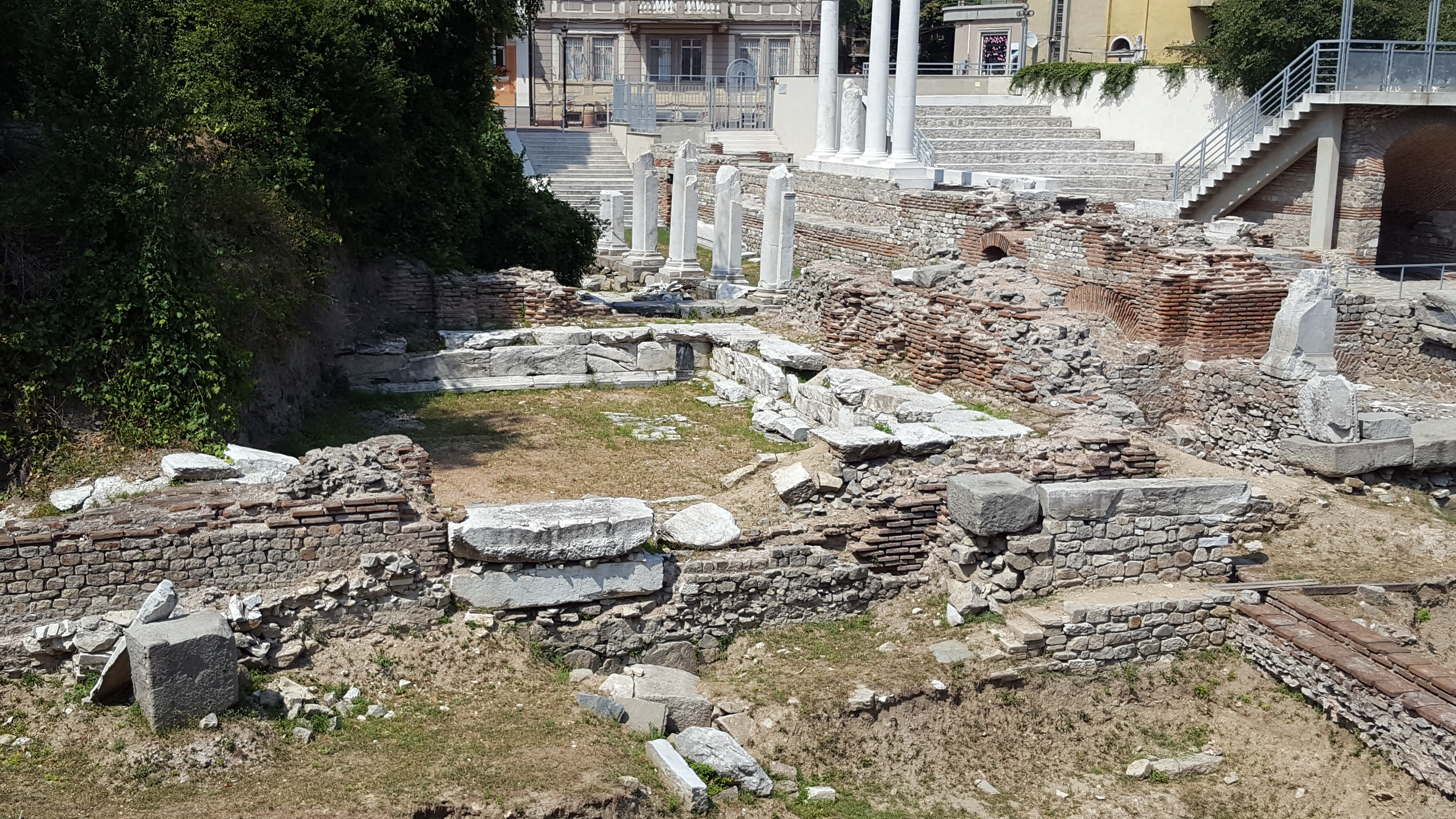
- The foundations of the library

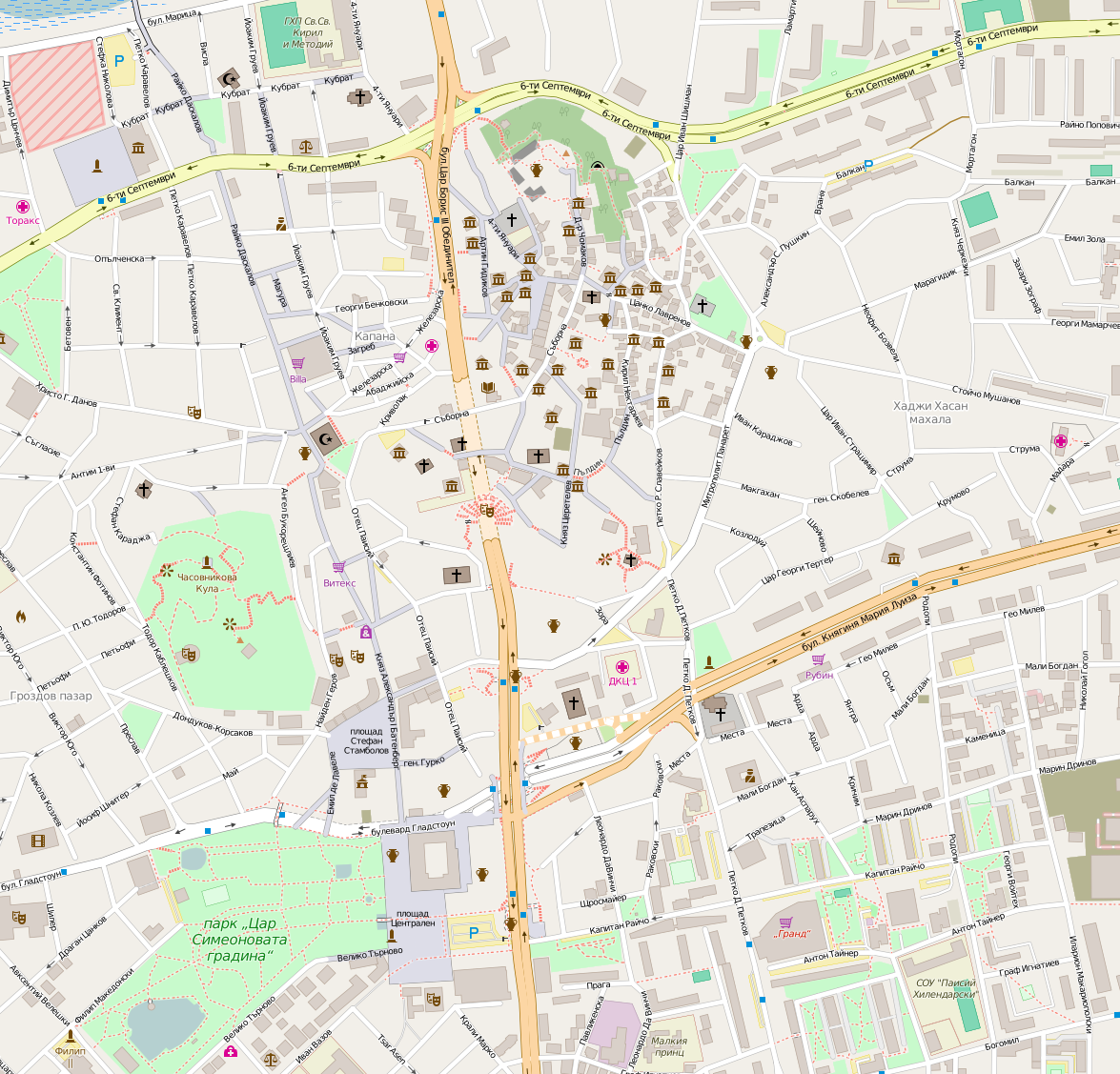
- Location within Plovdiv City Center
- 42.143431°N 24.750206°E
- Location: Plovdiv, Bulgaria

History
- Built: 2nd century AD

Site notes
- Material: bricks
- Length: 15 m (49 ft)
- Width: 20 m (66 ft)

The library of Philippopolis is one of the administrative buildings built in the Northern part of the Roman forum in Plovdiv. The rectangular-shaped building has an approximate width of 20m and length of 15m. The library's main purpose was storing manuscripts and scrolls but it was also used as a place for education, reading, public discussions and speeches. Philippopolis was among the few ancient towns which had a library.

== Location ==
The library in Plovdiv has been discovered near General Gurko Street, which is situated in the northeastern corner of the Roman forum. It is located adjacent to the Roman odeon. Surrounding this ancient monument, you will find the building of Plovdiv's central post office as well as the main pedestrian street of the city.

== The library ==
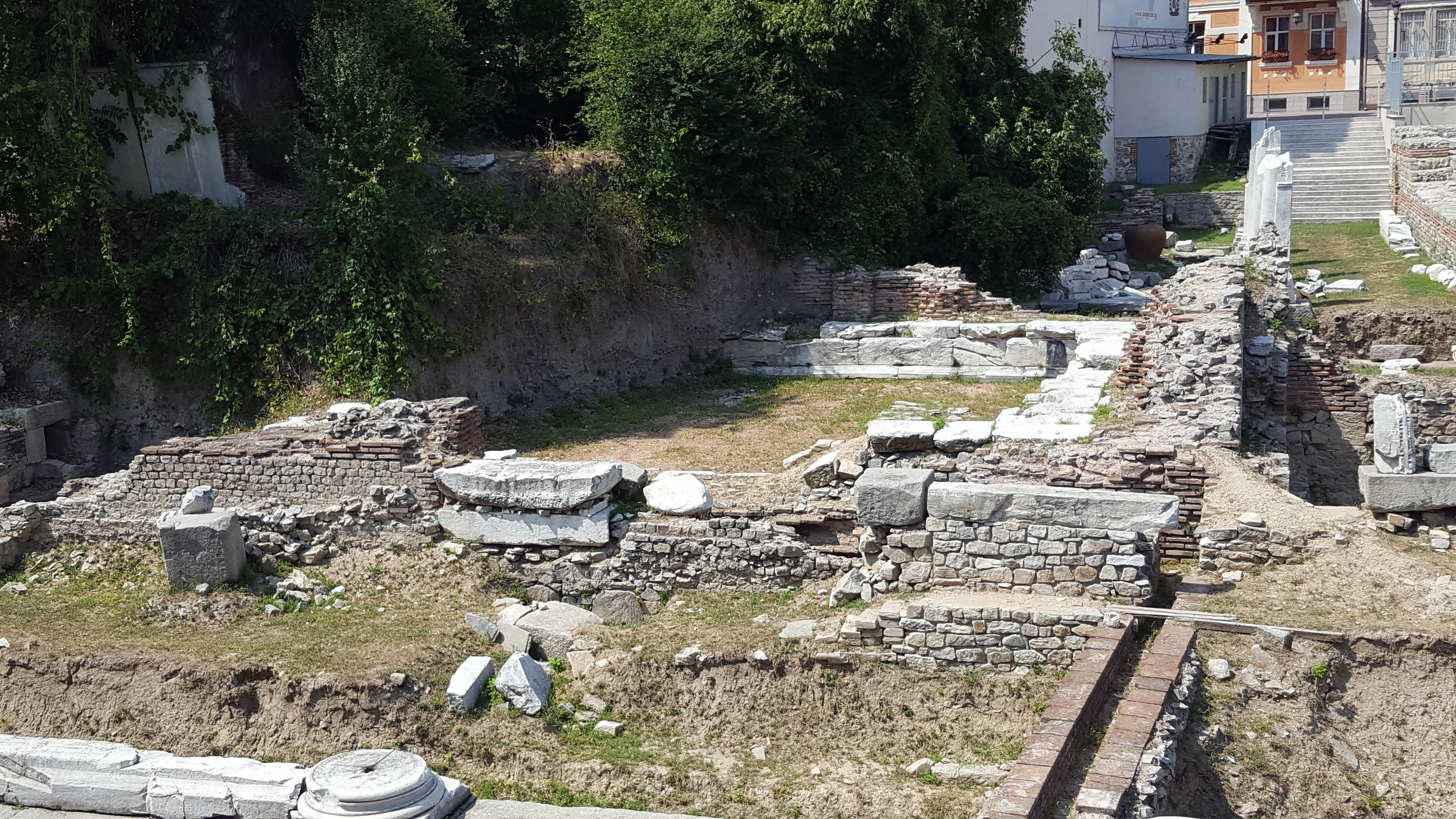
Part of the library is still hidden beneath modern buildings

One of the most interesting features of the ancient library is the construction of interior walls. When constructing the Roman bricks masonry multiple niches were formed in the interior of the walls. Archeologists suggest that wooden storage cabinets were placed there in which scrolls were kept. The floor was paved with marble slabs.

The library had an air circulation system in order to prevent humidity and moisture from damaging papyrus scrolls. Vertical clay pipes were embedded in the thick brick walls of the building to take the moisture out. They ended in a channel which was connected to the drainage system of the Roman forum.

== Conservation and restoration ==
The library of Philippopolis was discovered in the 1980s during the archeological research in the central Plovdiv. Currently, the western part of the building is still hidden beneath modern buildings.
