= Odeon of Philippopolis =

Ancient Roman odeon in Plovdiv, Bulgaria

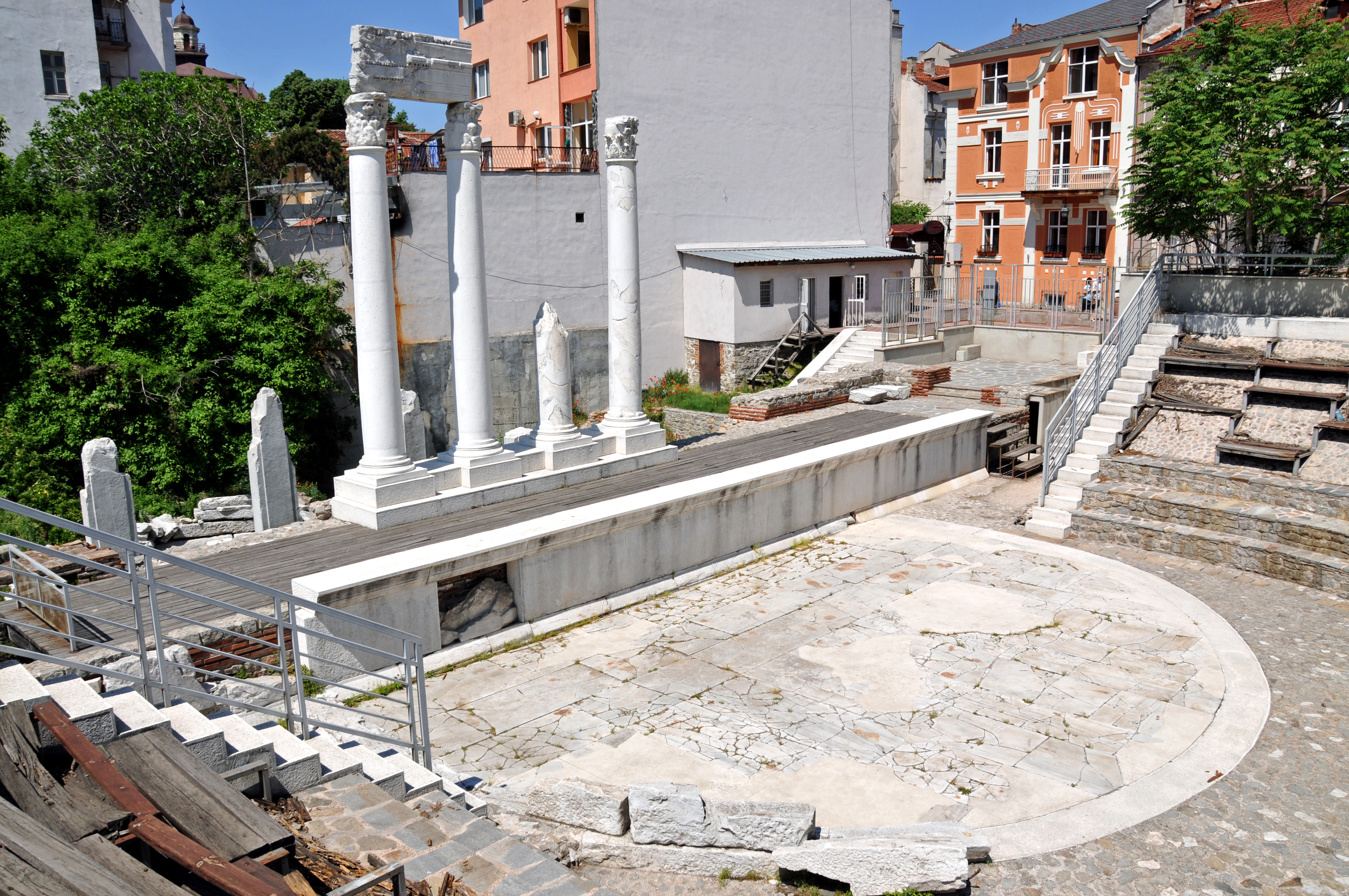

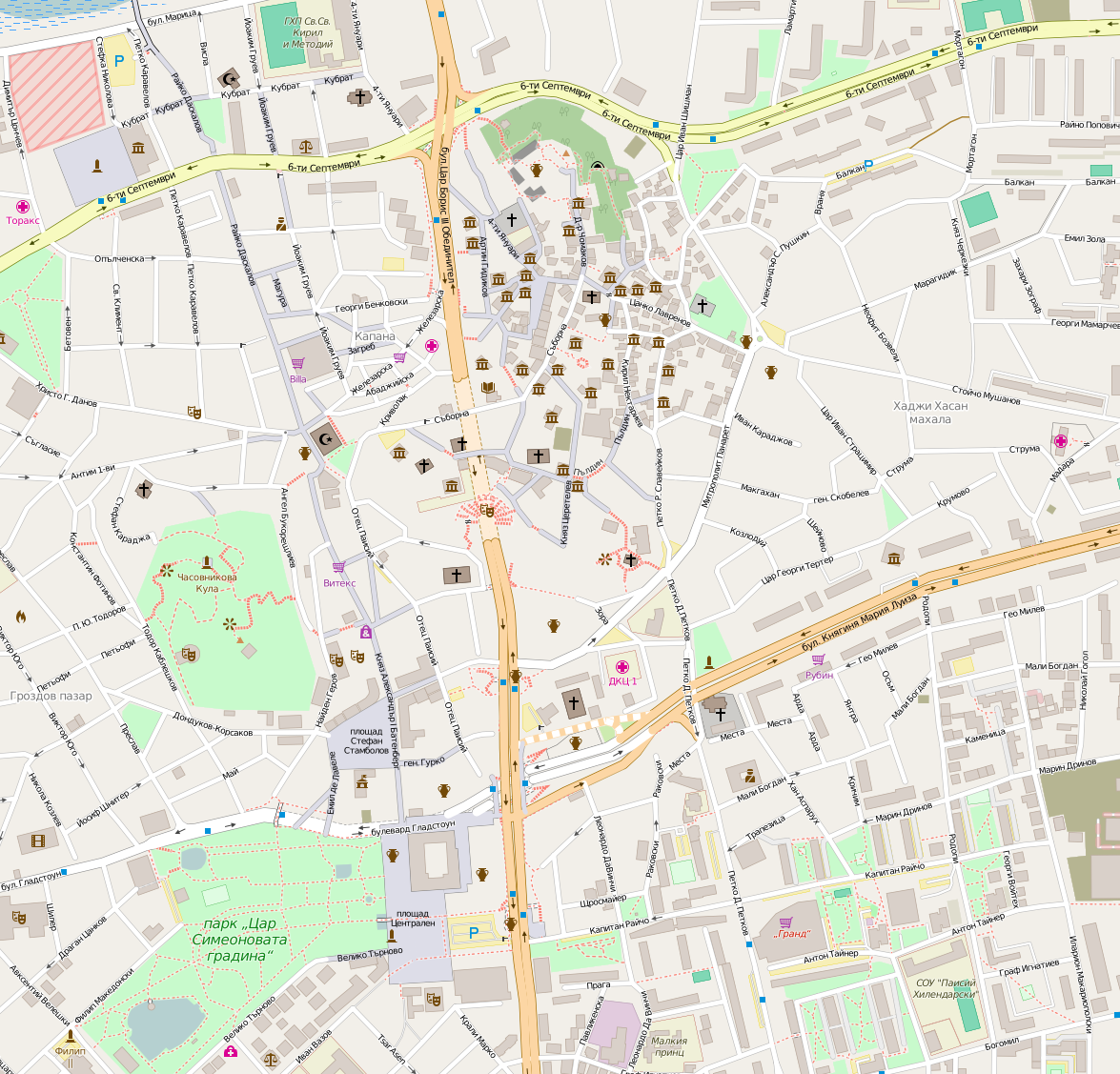
- Location within Plovdiv City Center
- 42.143607°N 24.750396°E
- Type: Odeon
- Periods: Roman Empire
- Location: Plovdiv, Bulgaria

History
- Built: 2nd century AD
- Abandoned: 4th century AD

Site notes
- Material: bricks, marble, stone
- Excavation dates: 1988
- Condition: Restored
- Owner: Plovdiv Municipality
- Public access: Yes

The Odeon of Philippopolis (Bulgarian: Одеон на Филипополис) was the house of the city council of citizens (known as bouleuterion) of ancient Plovdiv.

It was also used as a theatre due to its appropriate structure. The Odeon buildings had four construction periods: from the 2nd century AD (during the reign of Hadrian) when it was initially built to the 4th century AD when it was abandoned. The existence of such a building in ancient Plovdiv is a sign of the importance of Philippopolis as a cultural and political center.

Evidence of the 250/1 destruction by the Goths has been discovered around the Odeon.

== Location ==
The Odeon of Philippopolis was discovered near General Gurko Street in the northeastern corner of the Roman forum in Plovdiv. The natural connection between the odeon and the forum was destroyed during the construction of Maria Luiza Blvd. and the tunnel under the main pedestrian street of Plovdiv.

== The Odeon ==
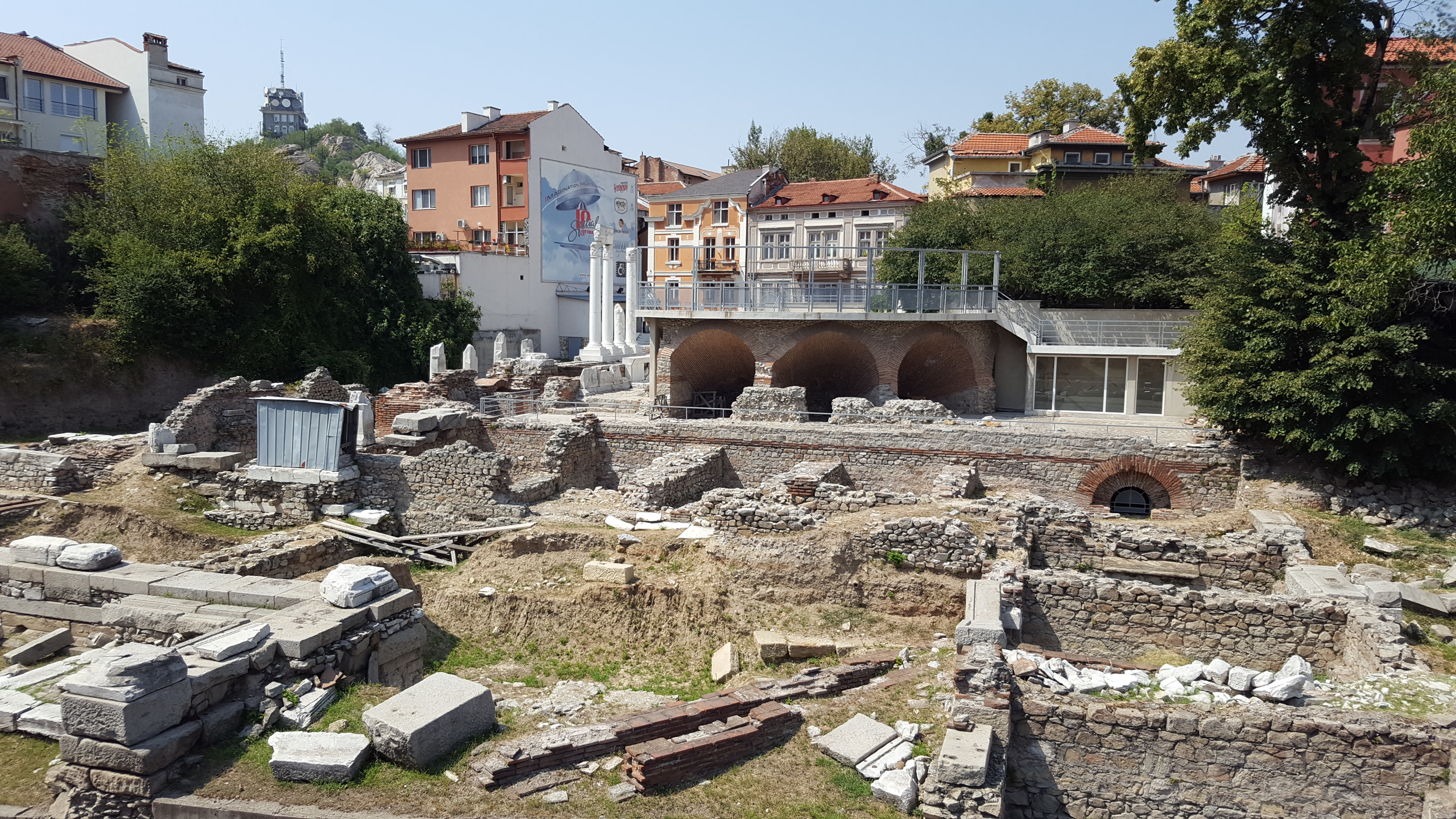
The Odeon and the Northern part of the Forum

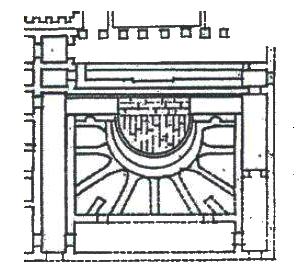
Plan of the Odeon

The Odeon was a rectangular building which comprised typical elements for roofed theatres like skene, orchestra and cavea. The skene is narrow and its length spreads through the entire width of the cavea. The proskenion (the podium in front of the skene) was 1,5m higher than the level of the orchestra. The skene was two stories high and built in the Corinthian order which was typical for the period. Typically for theatre buildings, vertical grooves were found in the skene's wall which indicate that a structure for raising and lowering a curtain probably existed. The height of the construction that bears the cavea was considerable.

The orchestra had a horseshoe shape which was typical for Roman provinces. In the last construction period of the Odeon, however, size of the orchestra was reduced and its shape became semicircular. The floor was made of large marble slabs surrounded by marble orthostates near the cavea. A wall around the Eastern end of the orchestra supported the lowest part the cavea.

The cavea surrounds the Eastern side of orchestra and had between 300 and 350 spectator seats arranged in step-like shape for better visibility. A vaulted structure with numerous vaulted spaces in truncated cone shape supported the cavea. A similar structure was used for the construction of the spectator area of the Colosseum in Rome. The cavea is separated from the skene via parodoi.

== Conservation and restoration ==
The Odeon of Philippopolis was discovered in 1988 by the archeologist Z. Dimitrov and Maya Martinova. In 1995 the ancient monument was listed as a cultural value of national significance. Conservation works were carried out in 2002 with financial support from the Leventis Foundation.

== Gallery ==
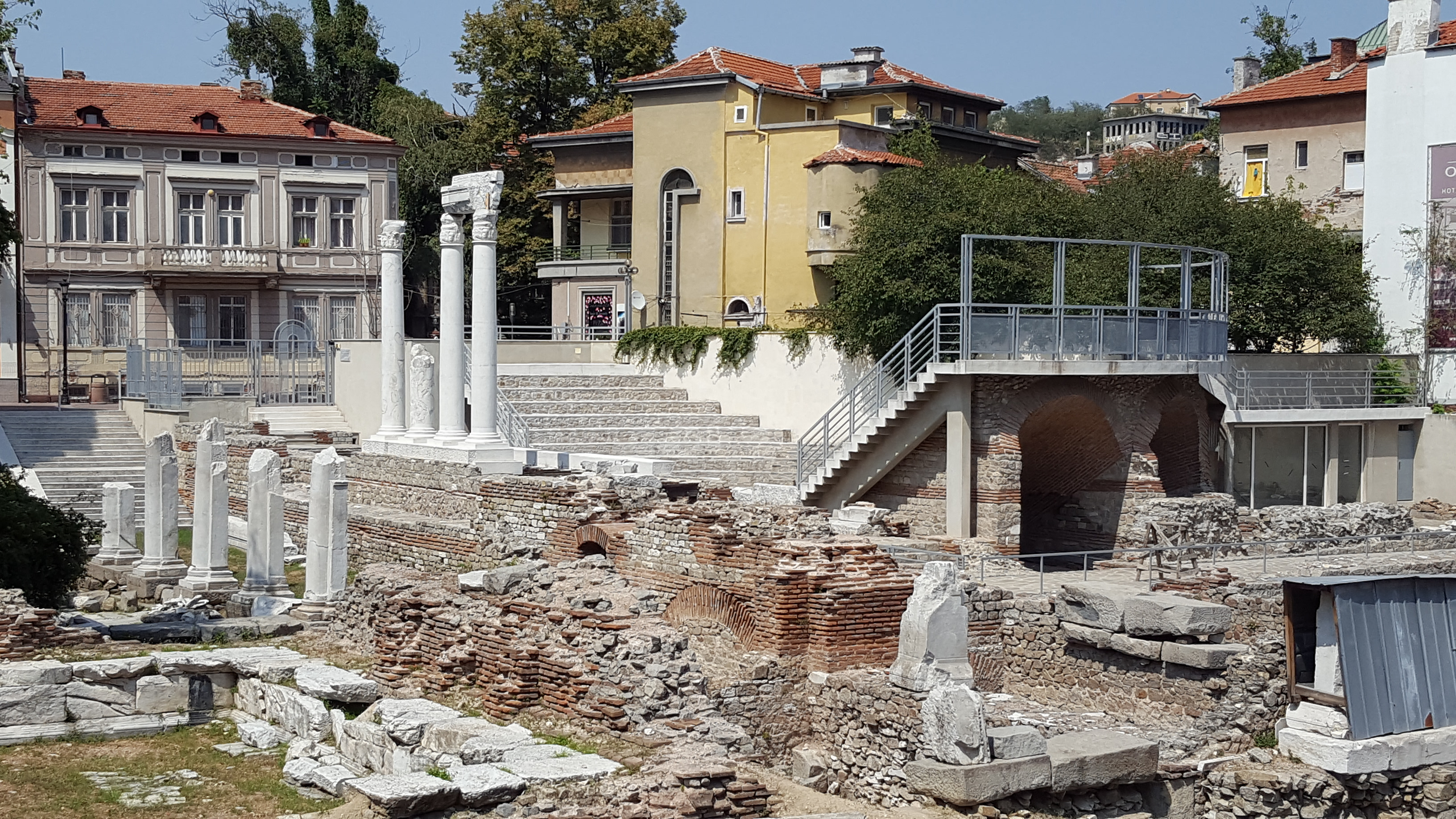

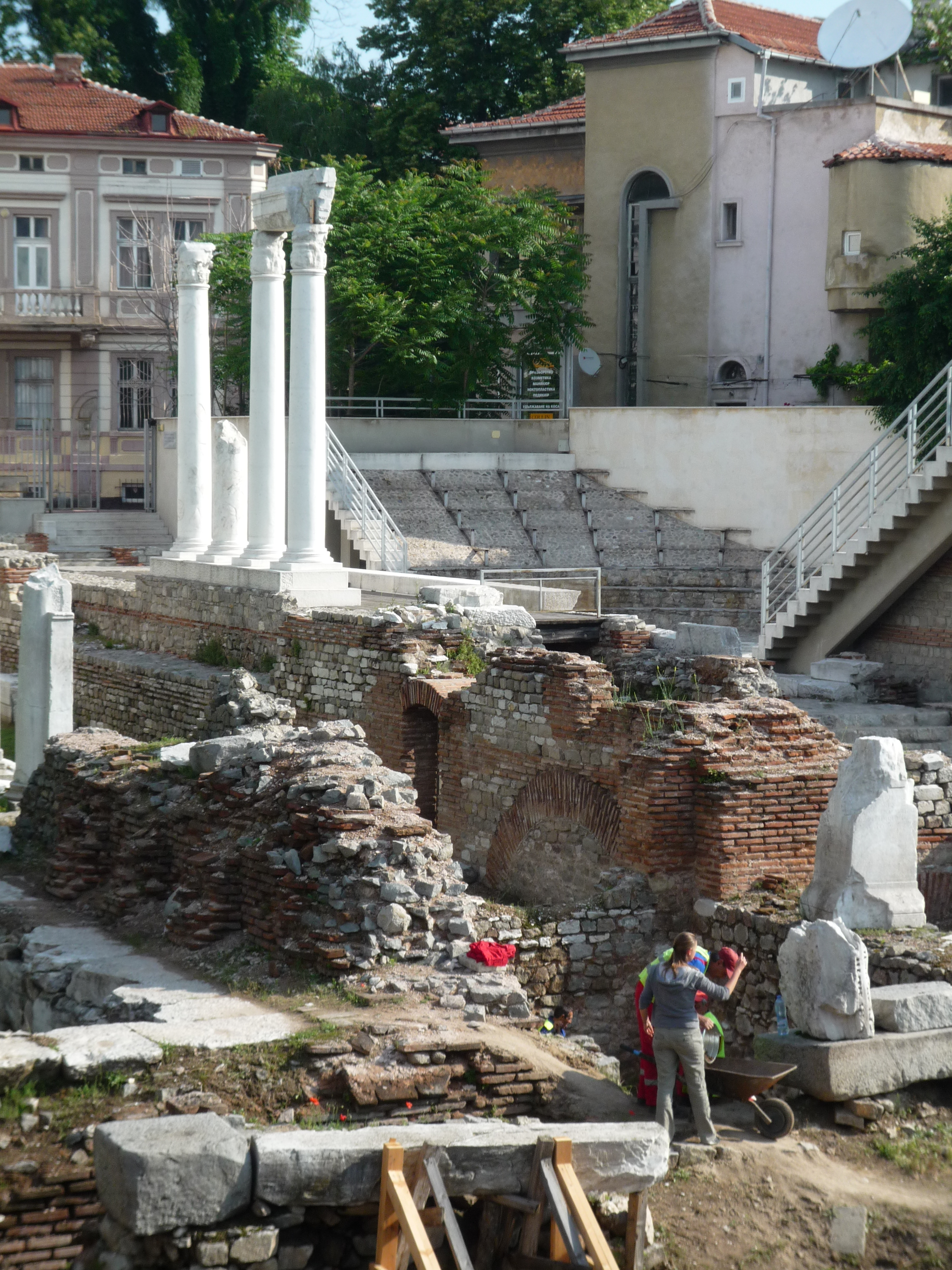

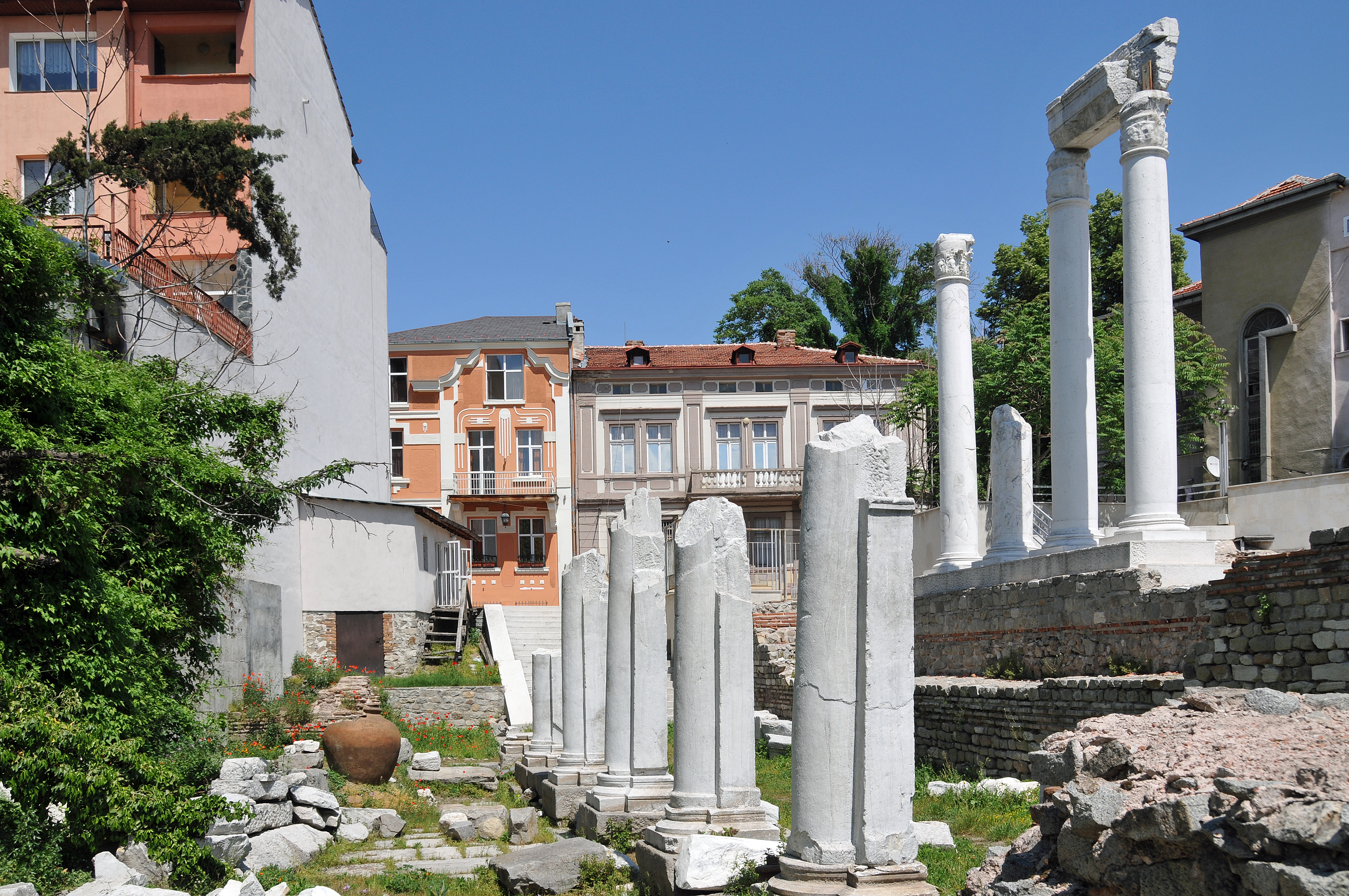

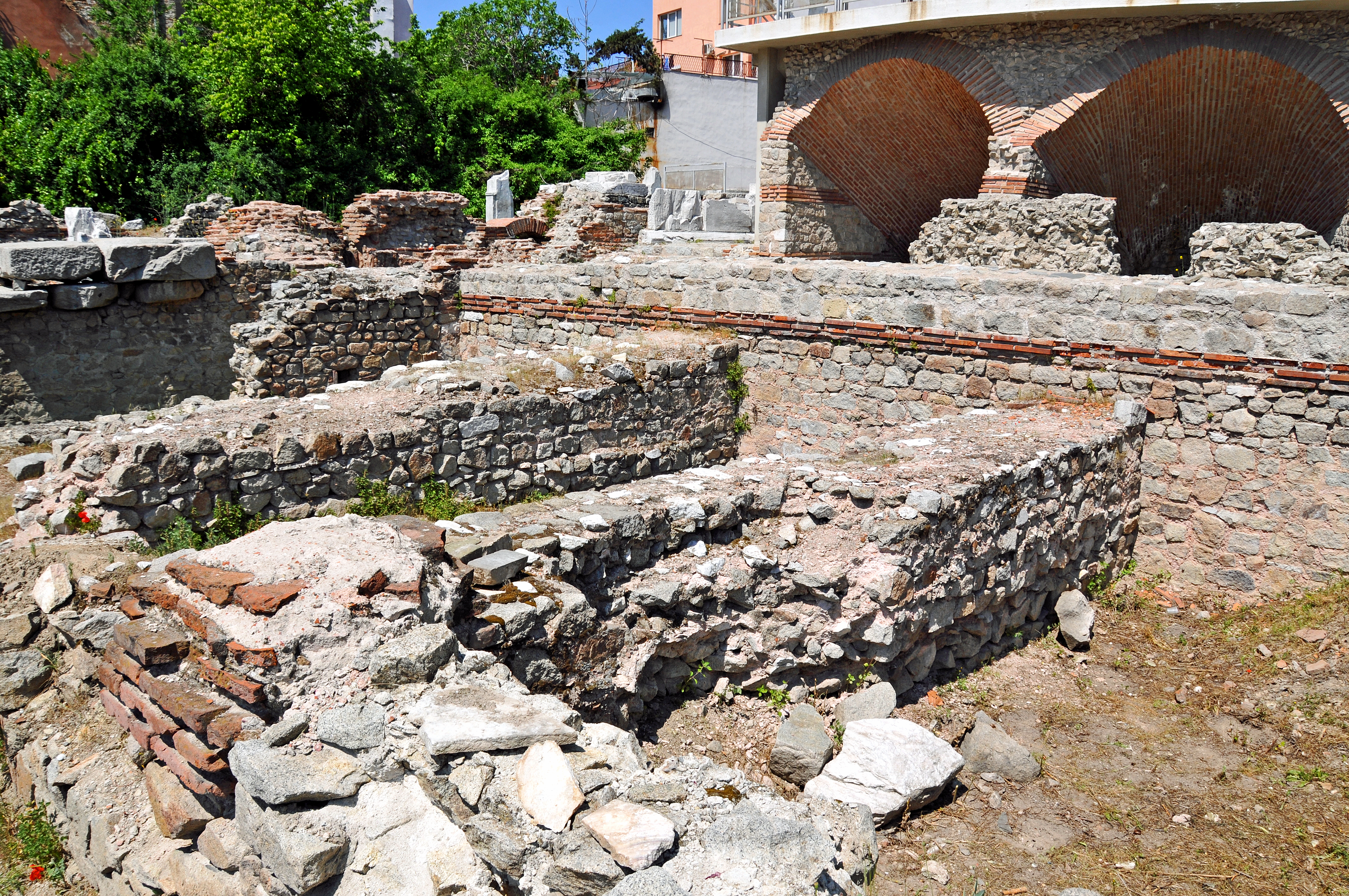
