= Roman forum of Philippopolis =

Historic Roman plaza in the city of Plovdiv, Bulgaria

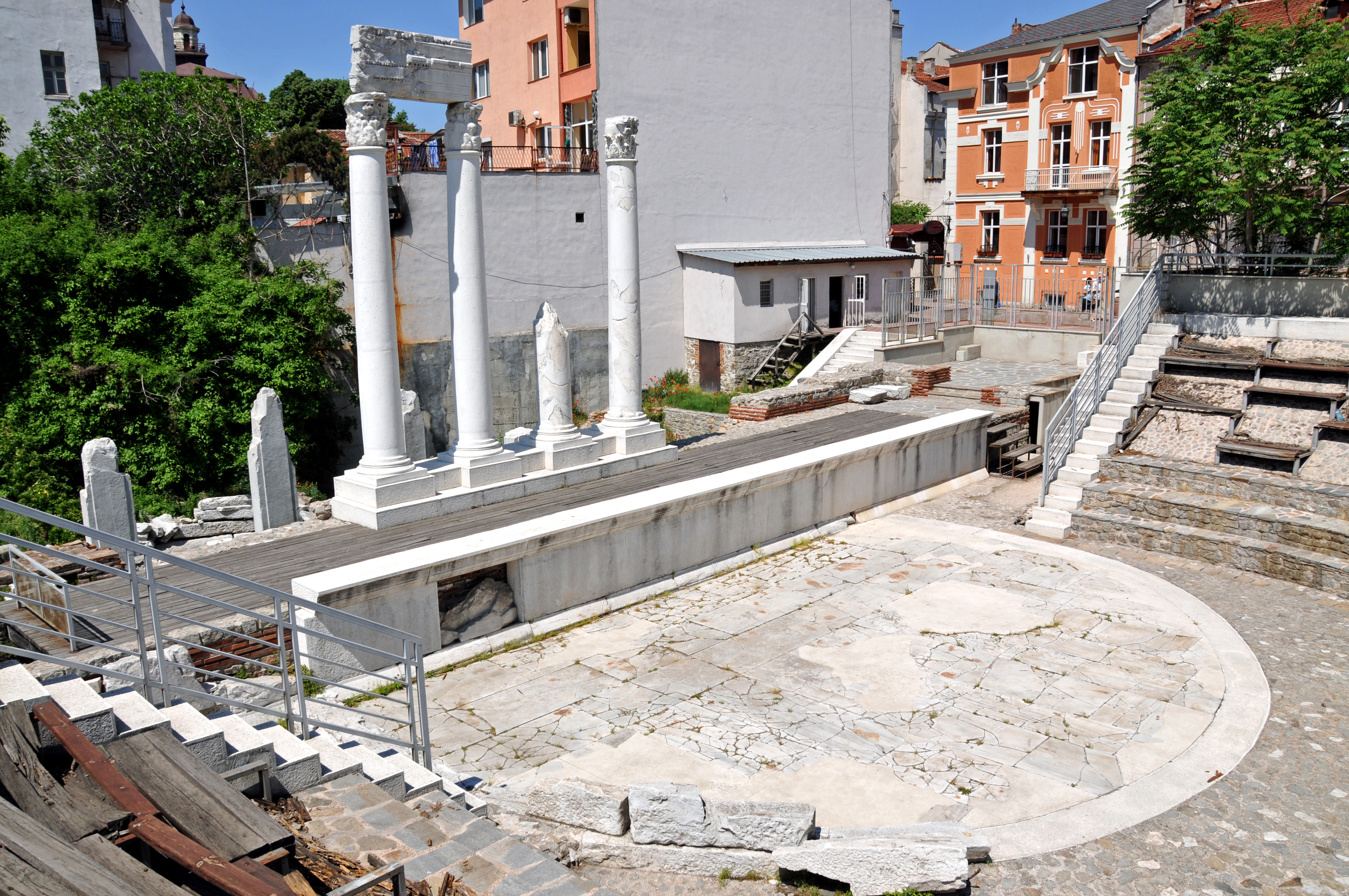

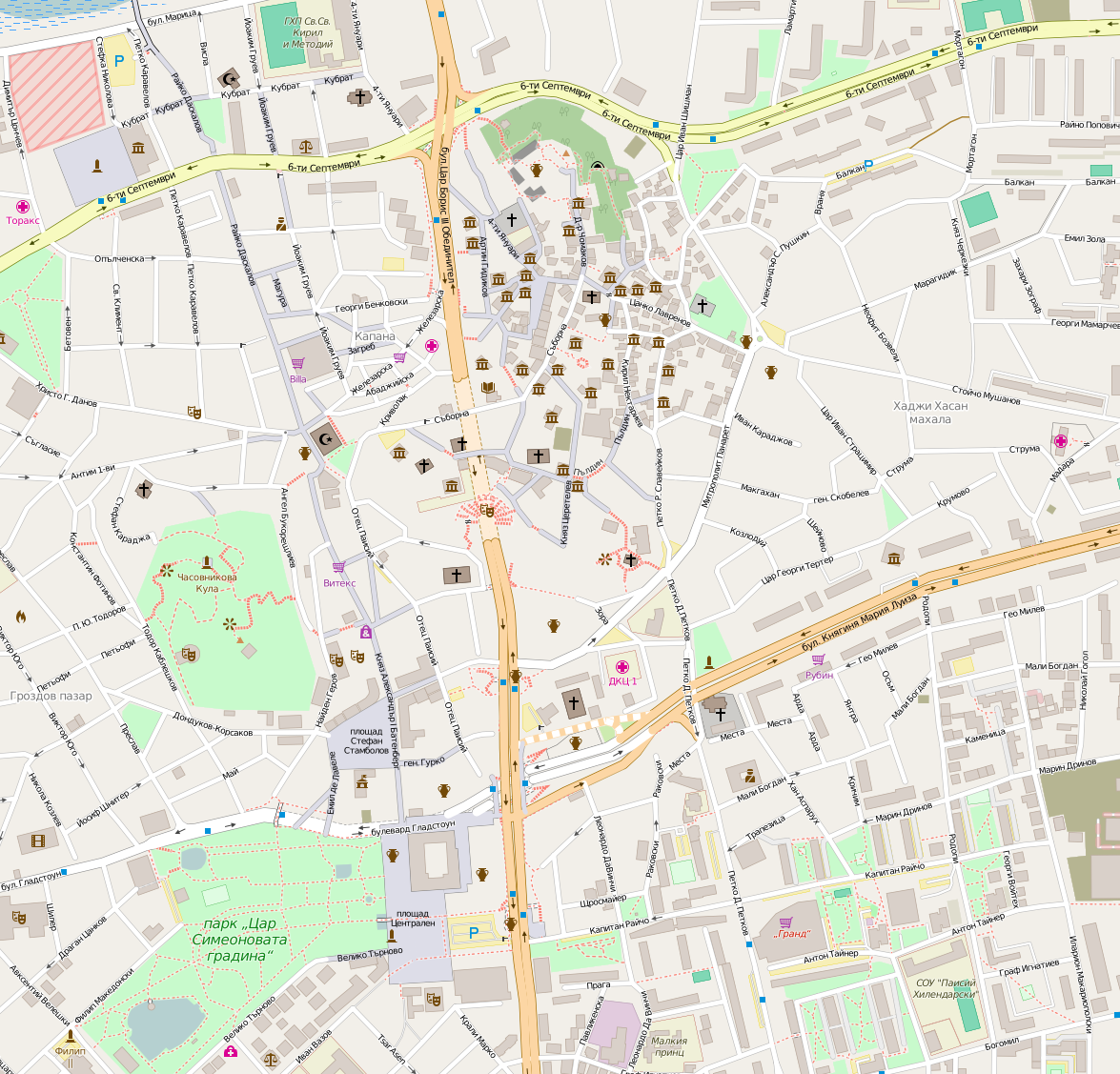
- Location within Plovdiv City Center
- 42.142112°N 24.750943°E
- Type: Forum
- Periods: Roman Empire
- Location: Plovdiv, Bulgaria

History
- Built: 1st century AD
- Built by: Vespasian
- Abandoned: 5th century AD

Site notes
- Material: bricks, marble, stone
- Length: 143 m (469 ft)
- Width: 136 m (446 ft)
- Area: 20 ha (49 acres)
- Excavation dates: 1971
- Public access: Yes

The Roman forum of Philippopolis (Bulgarian: Римски форум на Пловдив, Rimski forum na Plovdiv) is a rectangular forum (plaza) surrounded by the ruins of several ancient administrative buildings at the center of the ancient city of Philippopolis (modern Plovdiv). It was the center of public, administrative, commercial and religious life in the ancient city. Meetings, discussions, celebrations and state events were held there.

The forum covers an area of 20 hectares (49 acres), with 11 hectares (27 acres) excavated, which makes it the largest Roman forum in Bulgaria. The ancient city center was built in the 1st century AD during the reign of the emperor Vespasian, when ancient Philippopolis was laid out with a new urban plan and a forum according to the Roman model. The main streets of the city (the cardo and the decumanus maximus) intersect outside the eastern entrance of the forum. A complex of public buildings was built to the north, including the odeon, the library, and the treasury building.

The forum of the ancient city and its main street (cardo) are located at the very heart of modern Plovdiv's city center and main pedestrian area.

== Location ==
The Roman forum of Philippopolis is located near Plovdiv's General Gurko Street and the main pedestrian street of the city, Knyaz Alexander of Battenberg Street. The building of the central post office lies above the western part of the forum. The construction of Maria Luiza Boulevard in the 1980s split the northern part of the forum from the rest.

== History ==
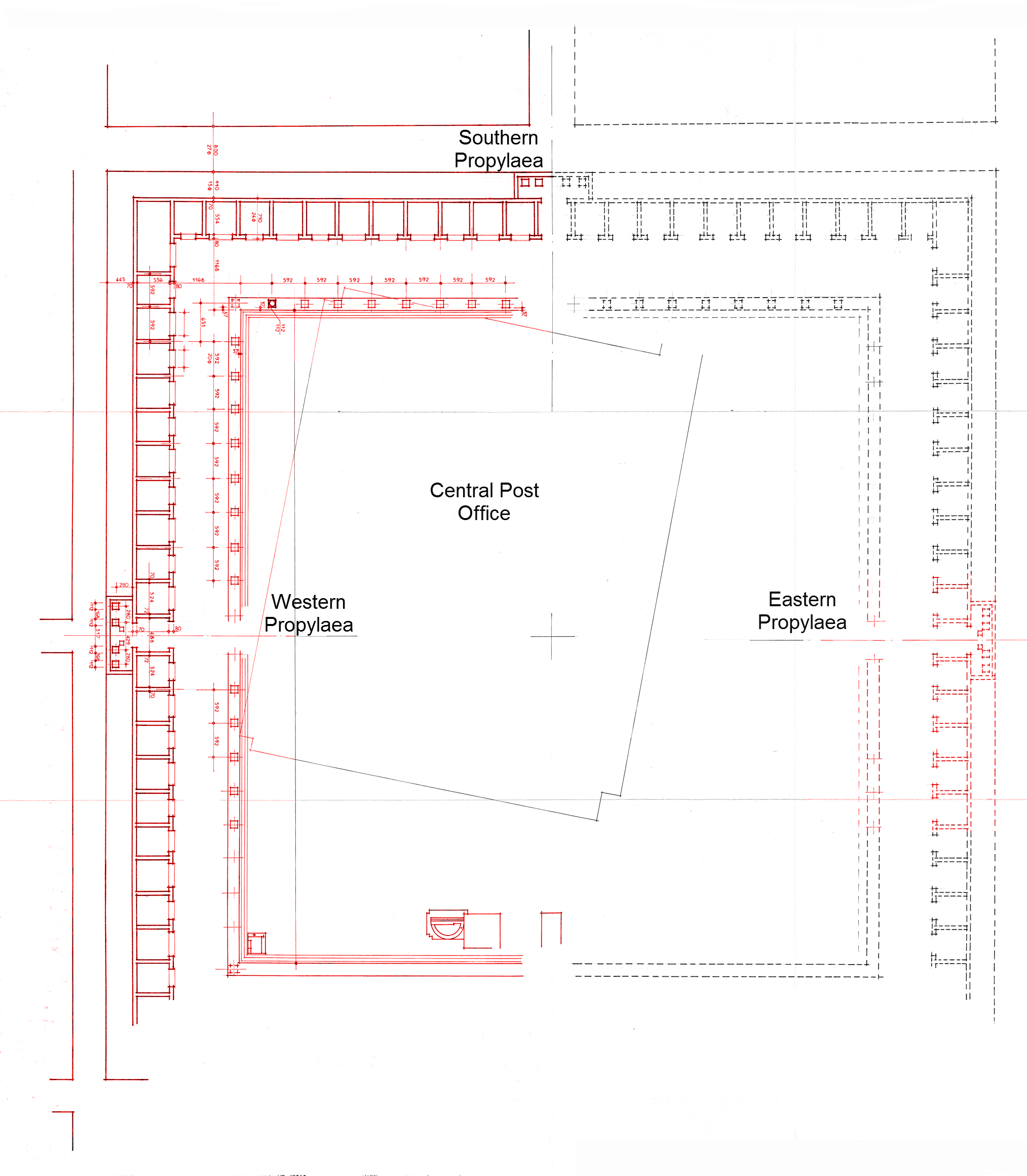
Plan of the ancient forum. Discovered parts are marked in red

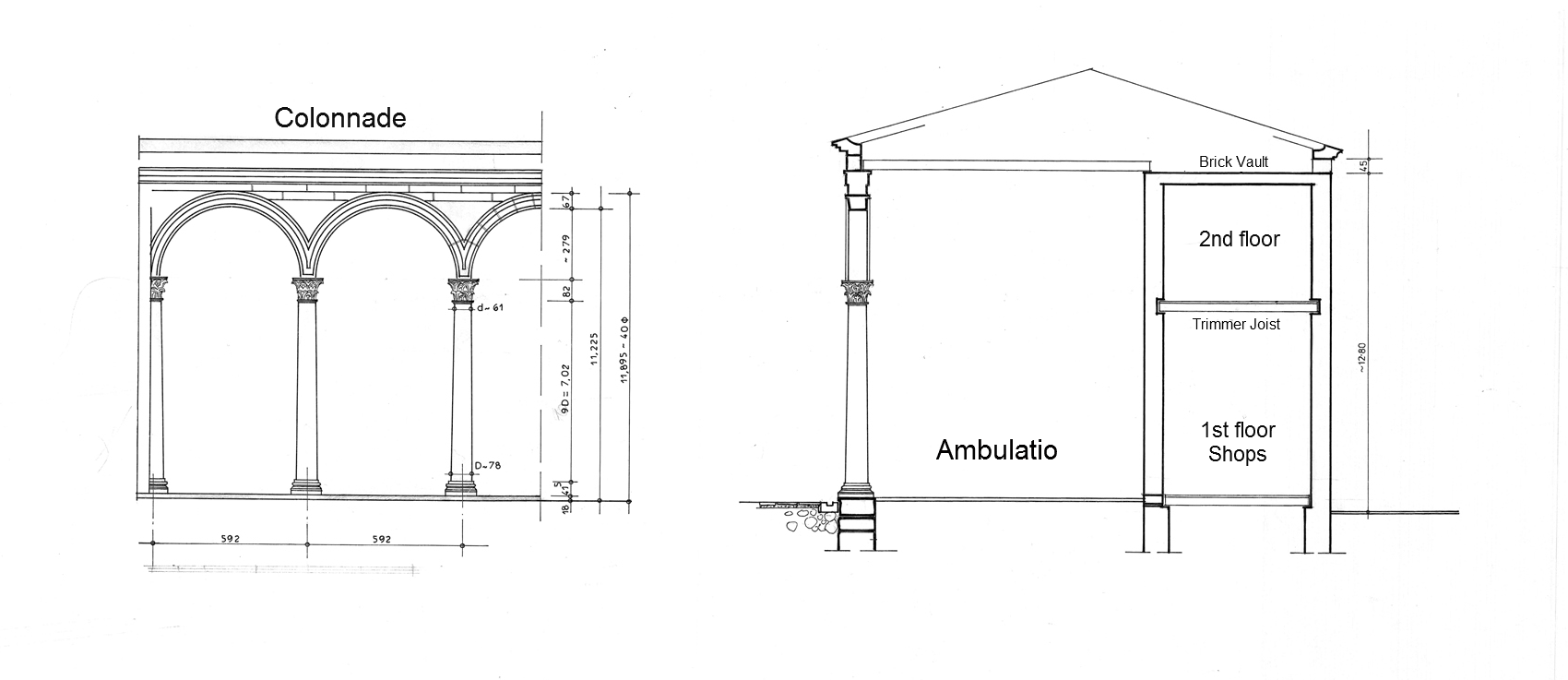
Drawing of the colonnade

The forum has rectangular shape, close to the shape of a square, with dimensions: 143 m in north-southern direction and 136 m in east-western direction. A complex of public buildings was built to the North, dominating over the rest of the buildings at the square. Three entrances, situated along the axes of the eastern, southern and western edge, provide access to the streets, located at the sides of the Forum. The main streets cardo and decumanus maximus intersect outside the eastern entrance of the complex.

It was used as a market thoroughfare where merchants and people from the city and the region gathered to exchange Thracian grain, wood and honey for fine pottery and bronze vessels brought as far as Italy. Stores and shops occupied the eastern, the southern and the western side of the forum and patrons entered them through narrow porticoes.

Four main construction phases can be distinguished in the historical layers of the forum. They are different in terms of their level, architectural design and use of building materials.

The first construction phase marks the beginning of the complex development and bears the plan shape of the urban square. During the second construction phase the levels of the shops, the ambulation and the area were raised. A heavy crepidoma supports the stylobate of columns in the Doric order, made of sandstone. The stone drainage leading rainwater away from the roof of the portico kept its original place. The ambulation was 11 m wide. The eastern, southern and western sides were formed by four-column propylaea in the Ionic order. During the third construction phase the plastic decoration of the complex was replaced. The portico around the area is made of marble. The largest number of well-preserved original remains date back to the fourth and final construction phase. Over the existing crepidoma a new stylobate of syenite blocks was placed. It bore a marble arcade of free-standing columns in the Roman Corinthian order.

The public buildings for the needs of urban governance and other manifestations of urban life were situated in the northern part of the forum complex. Epigraphic documents attest the existence of an official treasury. In the northeast corner an odeon (Bouleuterion) is unearthed, and to the west of it are the remains of city library.

At the northern side of the complex some inscriptions, related to the religious and administrative life of the town were found, along with a piece of an invitation card for a performance of gladiator fights. In the area were found pedestals for statues, an exedra – a platform for speeches, and remains of an altar with inscriptions, dedicated to the goddesses Demeter and Kore (Persephone).

It went silent in the middle of the 5th century when waves of Barbarians forced the people of Philippopolis to abandon the quarters in the plain and move to the acropolis.

== Conservation and Restoration ==
The Forum of Philippopolis was discovered in 1971 during the construction of the central post office building in Plovdiv. The Eastern, the Northern and part of the Southern part of the ancient central square were revealed.

In 2012, excavation works began in the North-western part, revealing an area of 400 sq.m between the post office building and Tsar Simeon gardens.

== Gallery ==
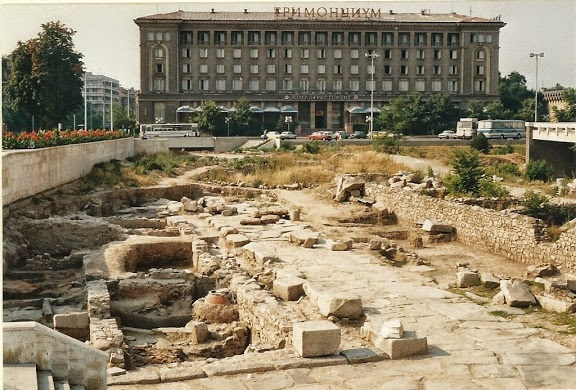
The Roman forum of Plovdiv, postcard from 1988

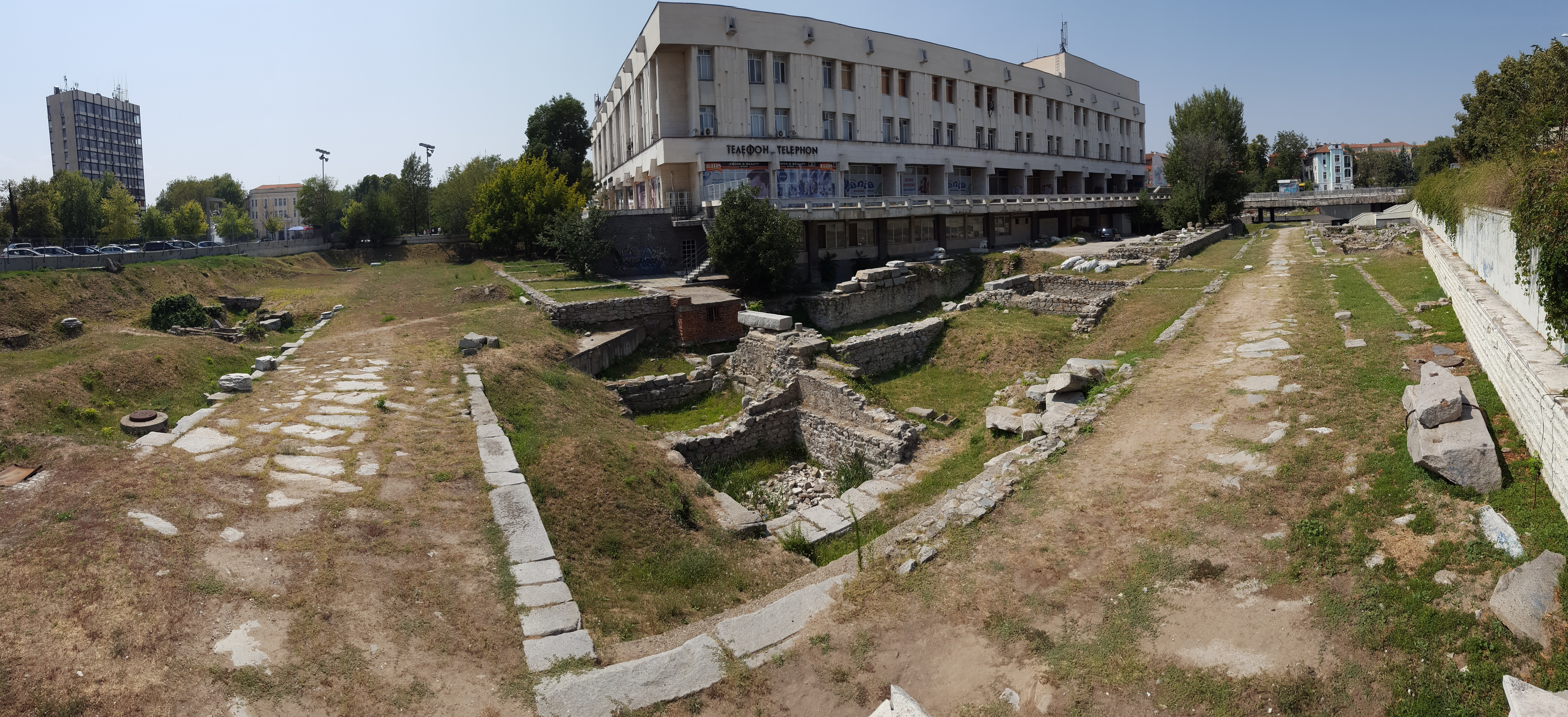
Panoramic view of cardo maximus and decumanus maximus

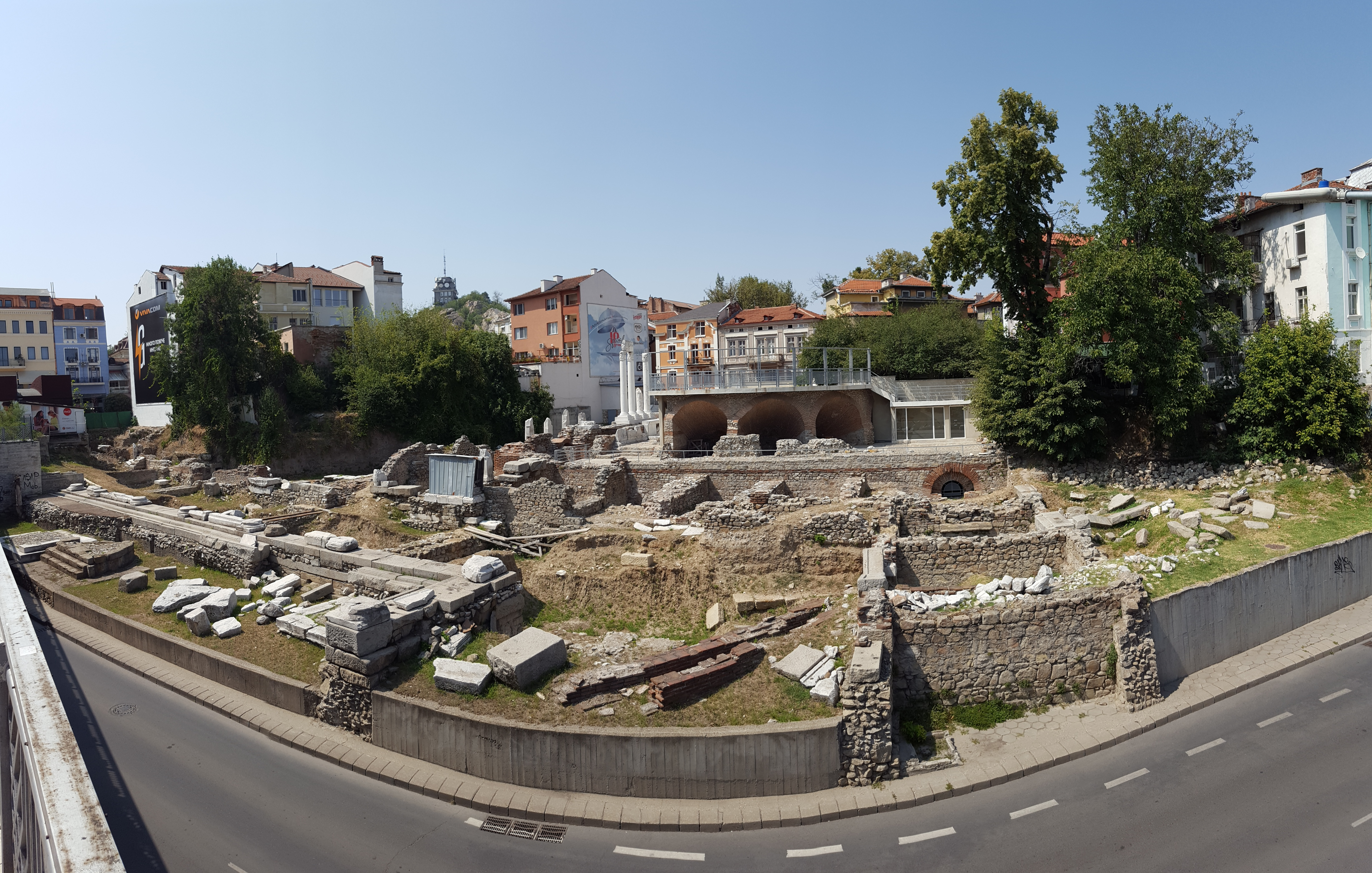
Panoramic view of the Northern part

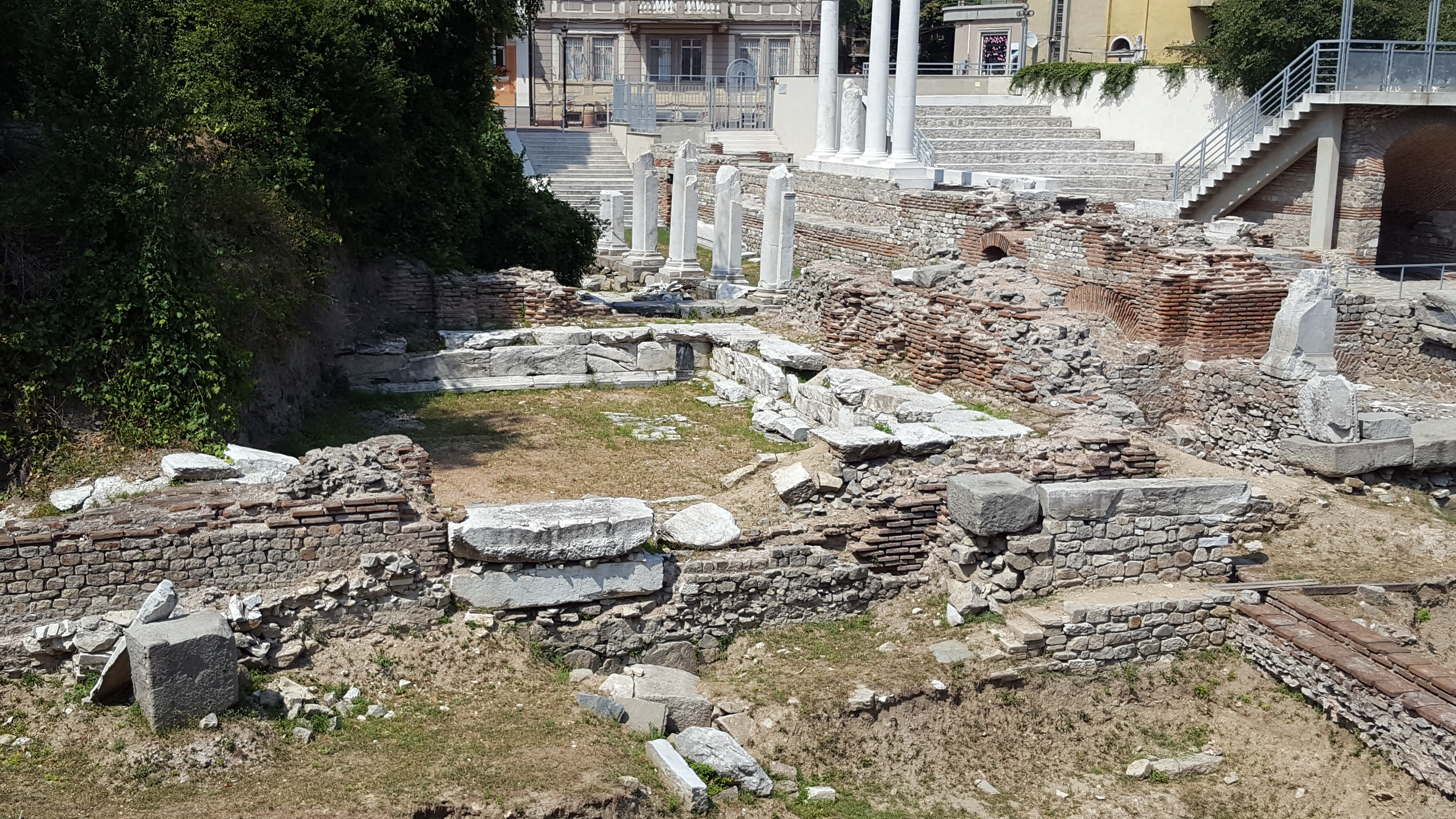
The remains of the city library

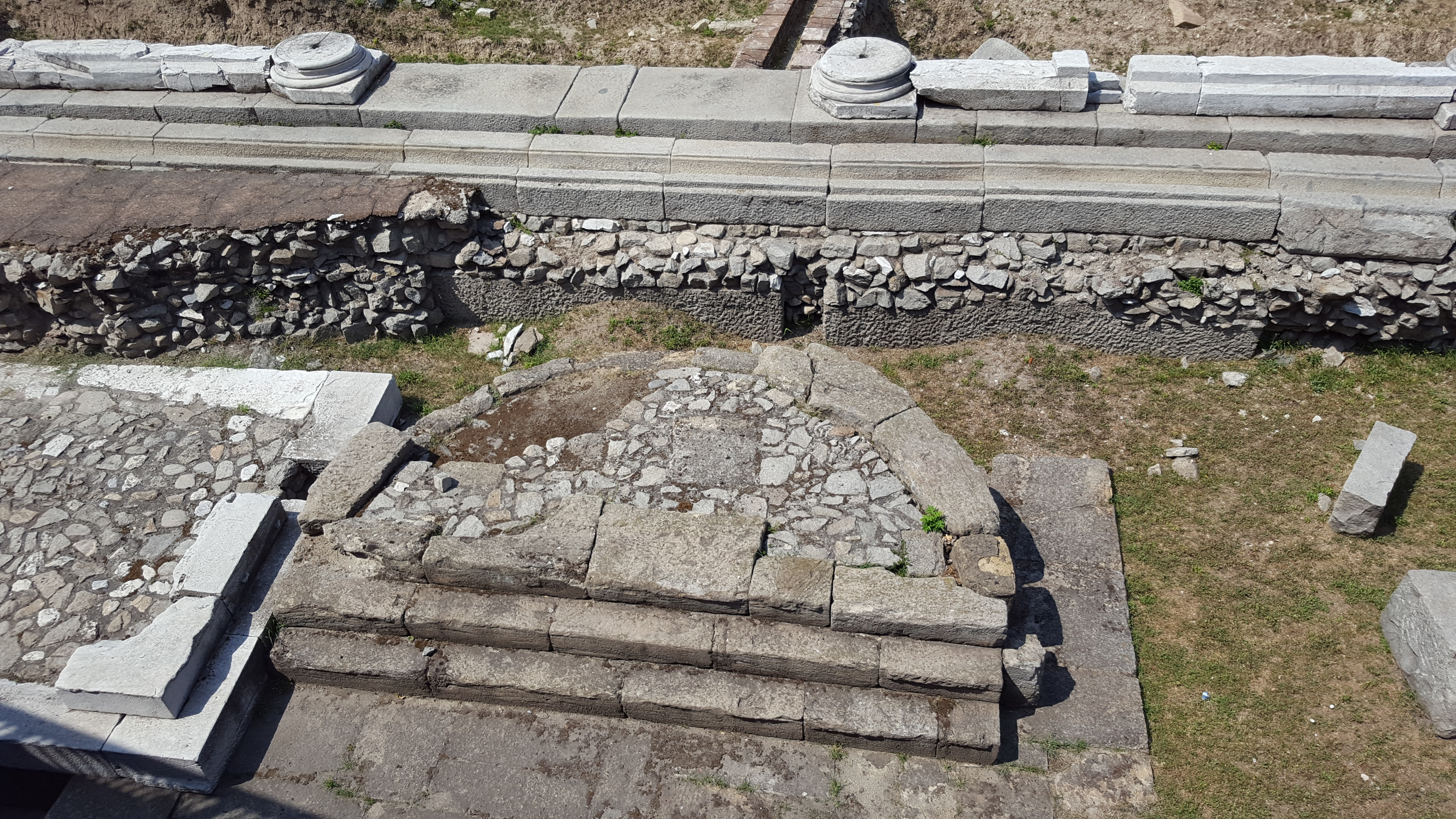
The remains of the Northern part of the Forum

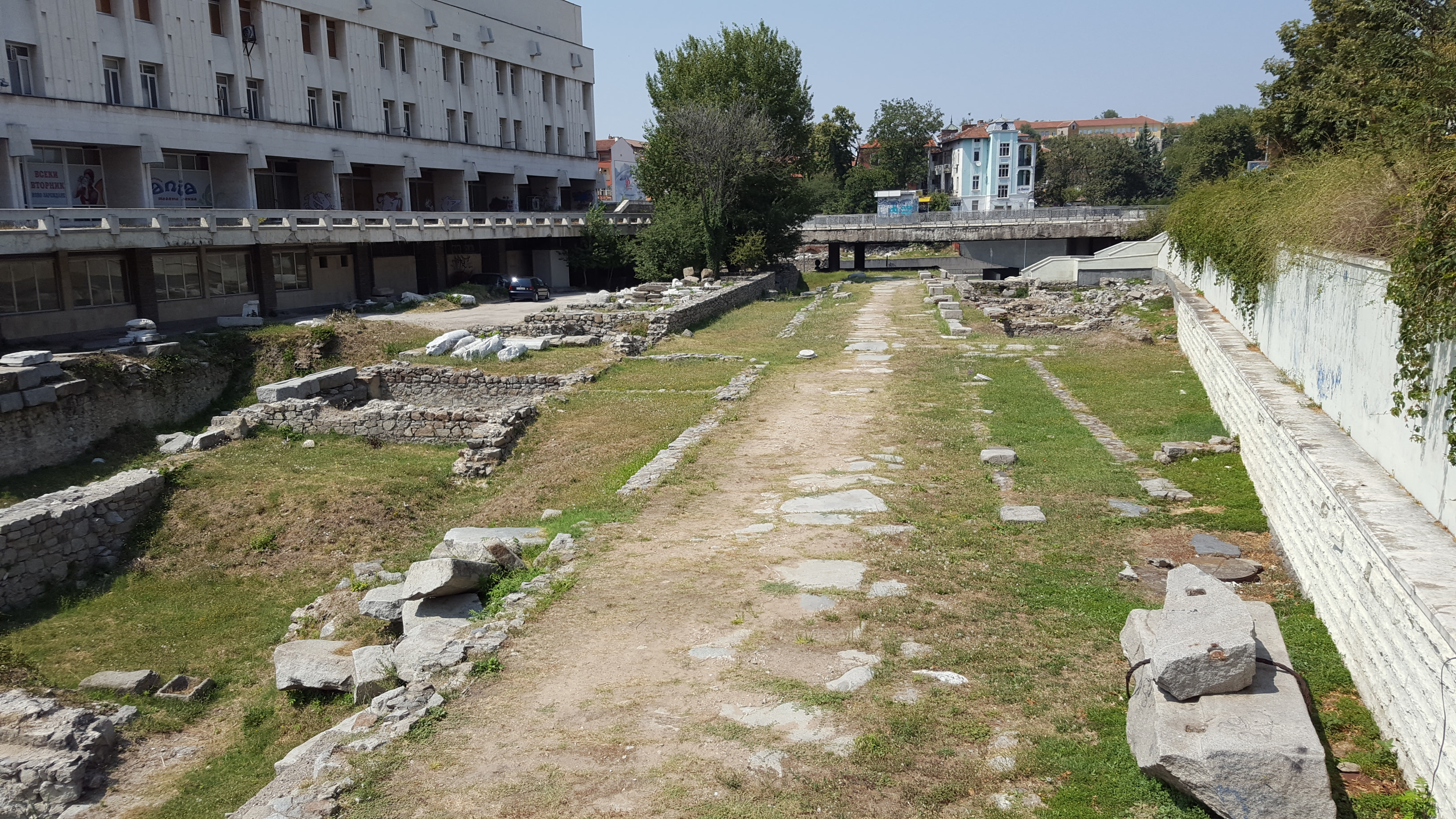
Cardo Maximvs (the main street with North-South direction)

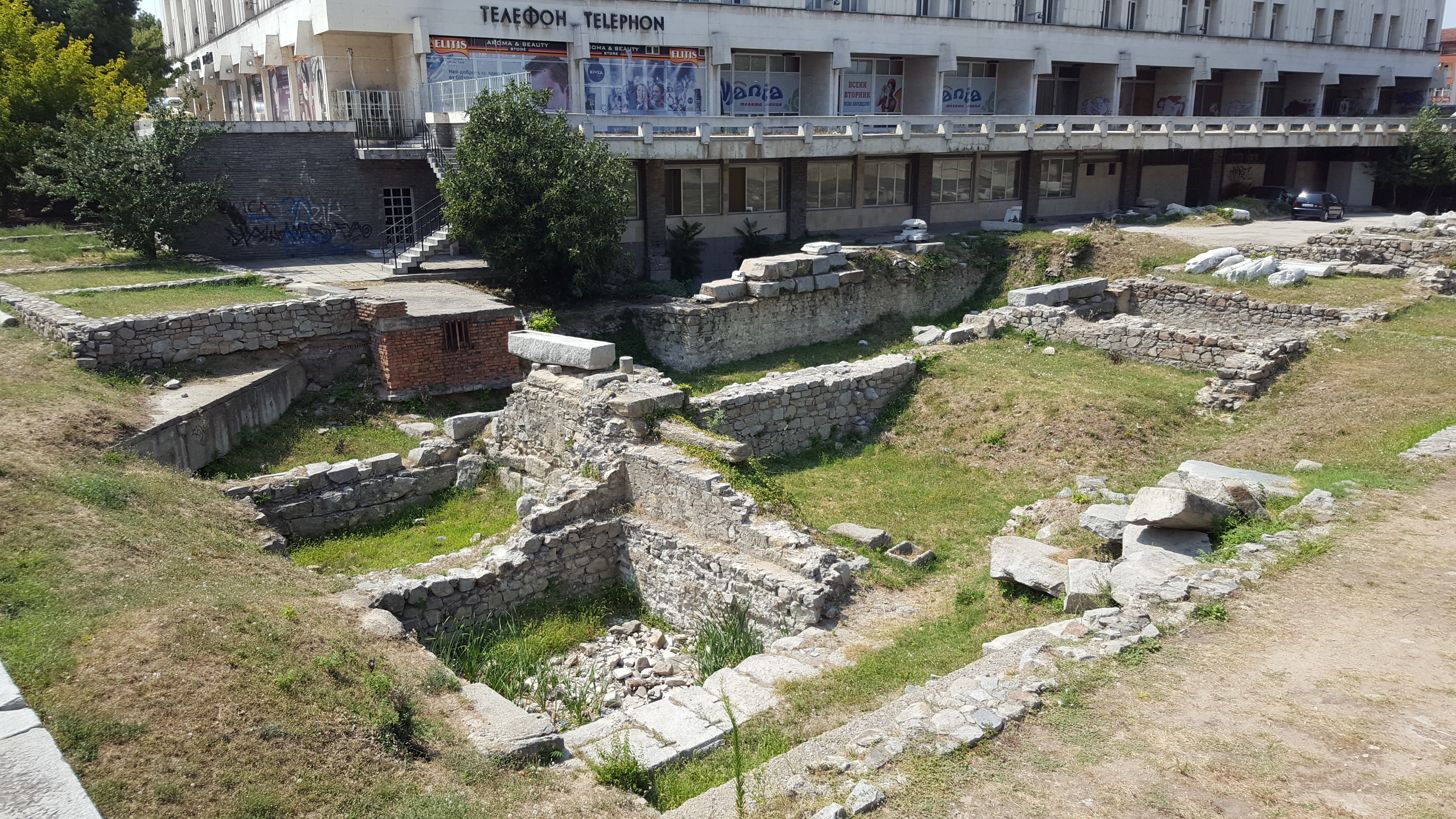

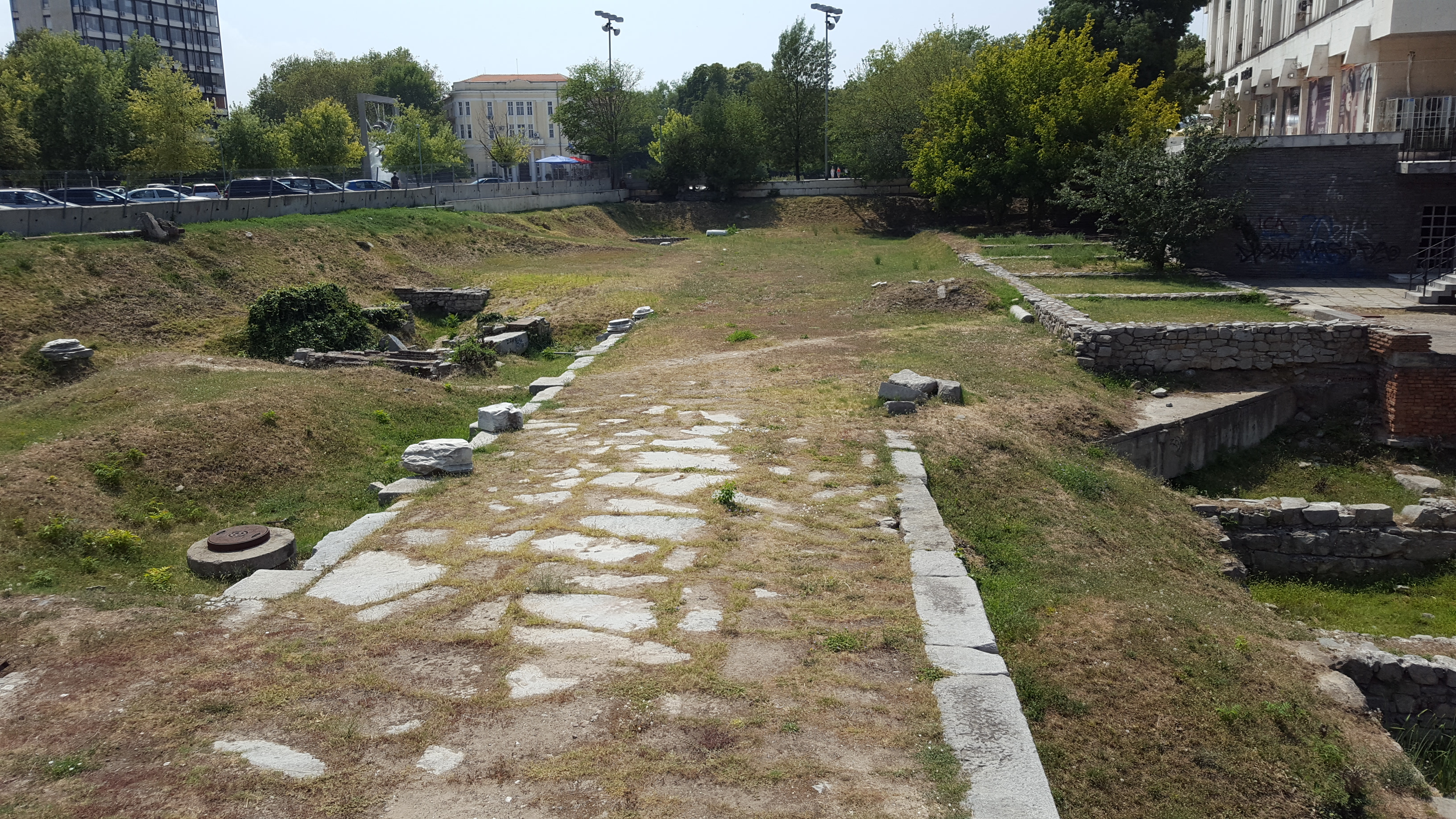
Ancient street with East-West direction)

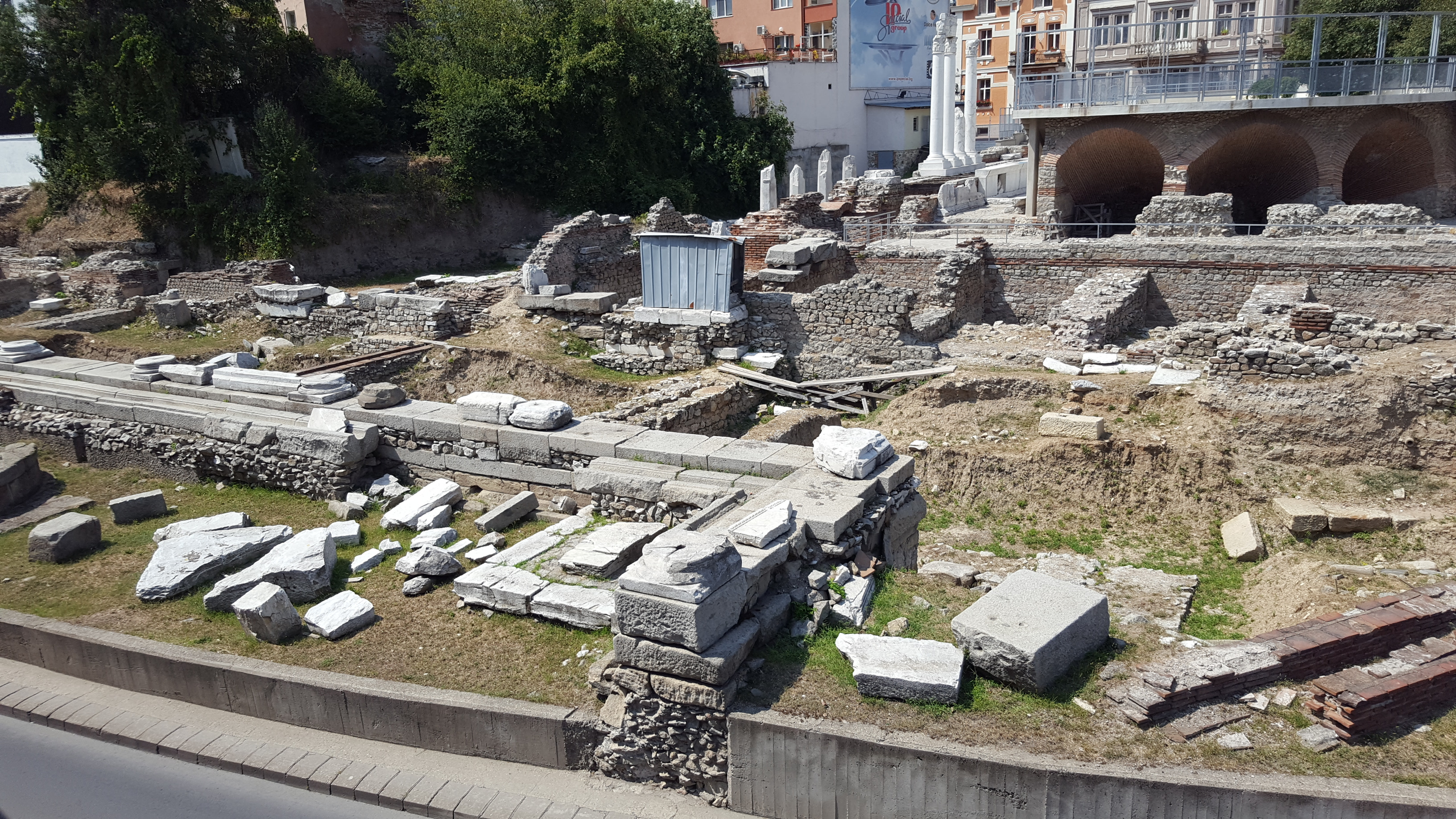
The North parg of the forum

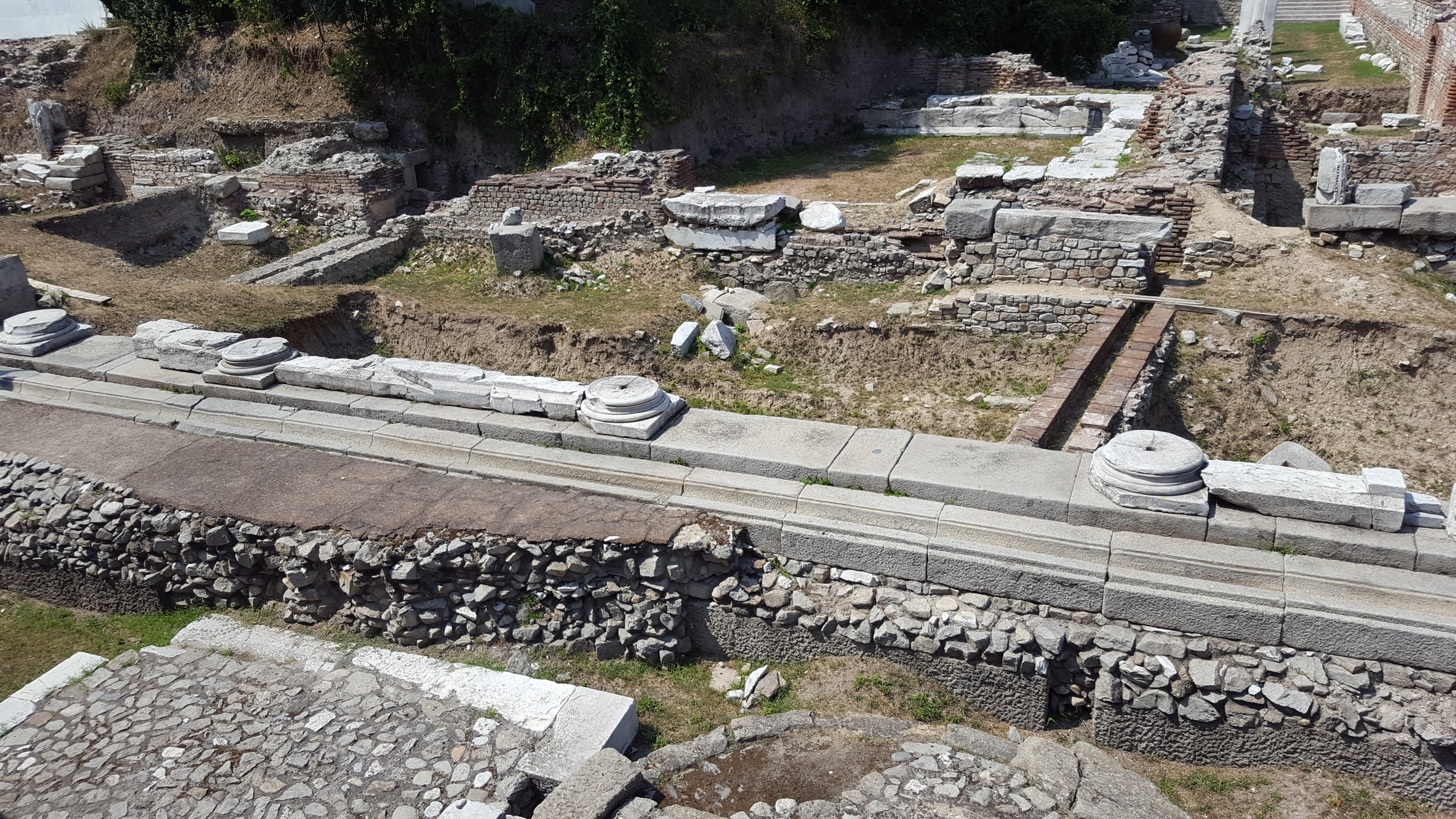
The stylobate

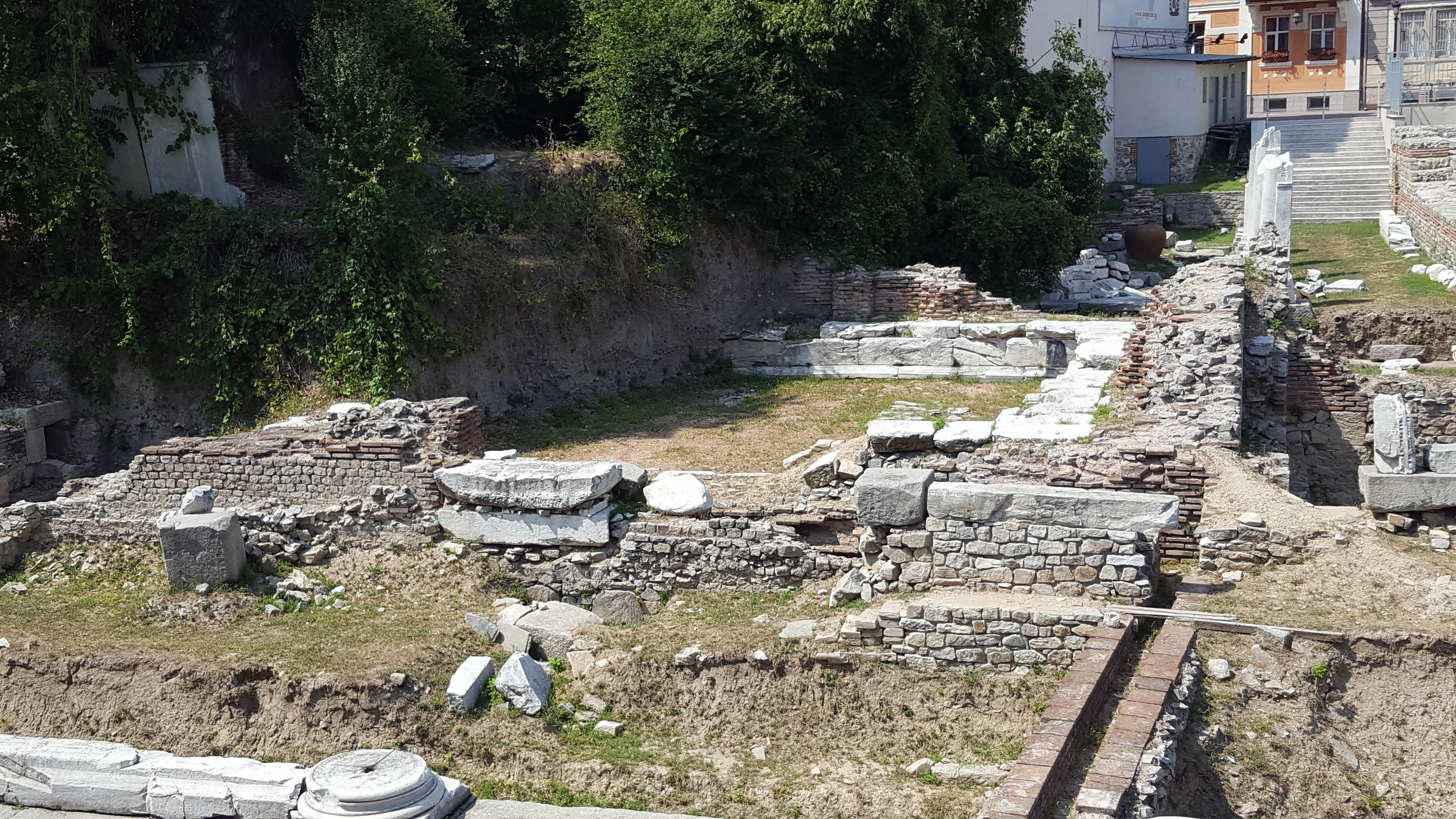
The city library of Philippopolis

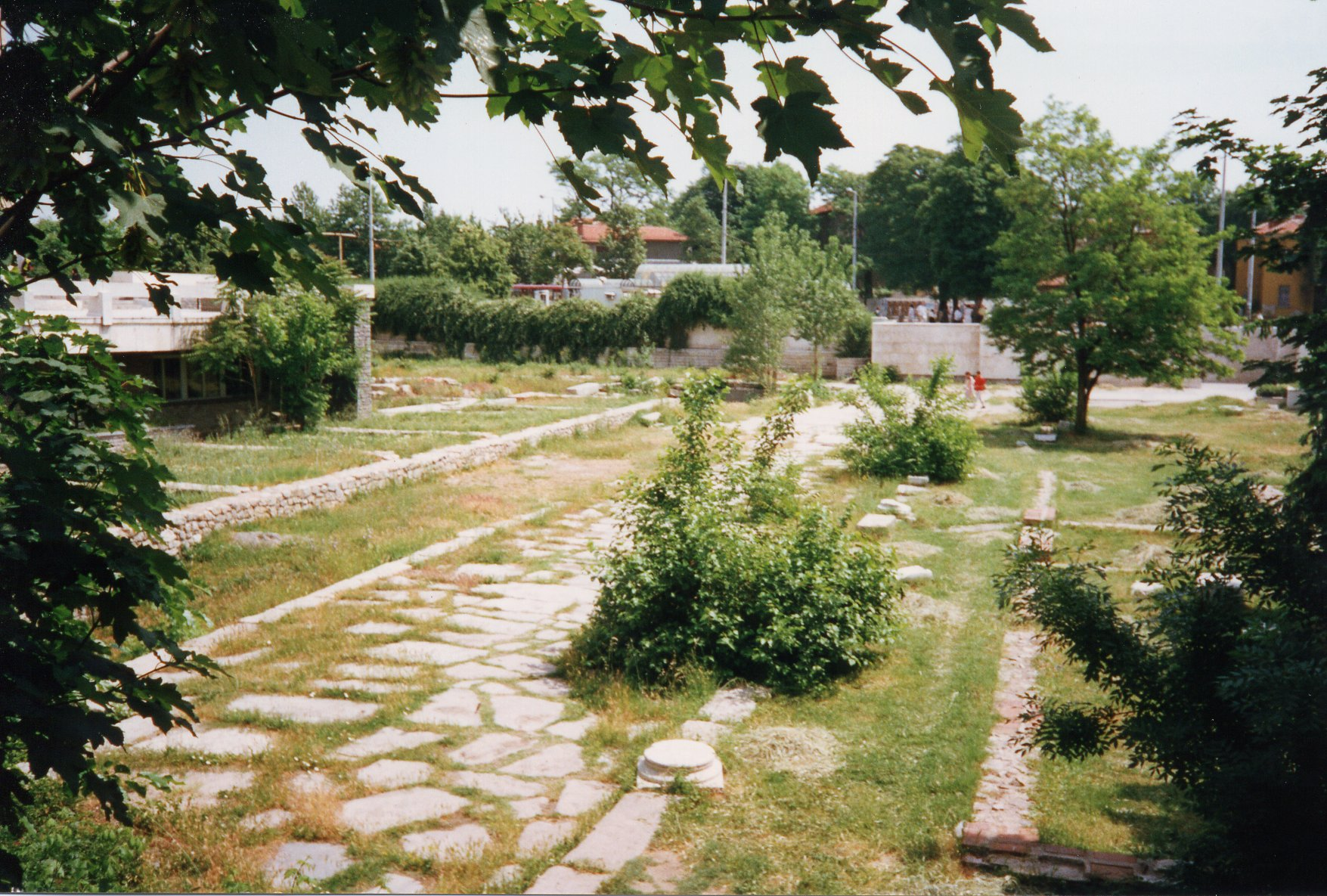
South-Eastern part of the forum, 1997

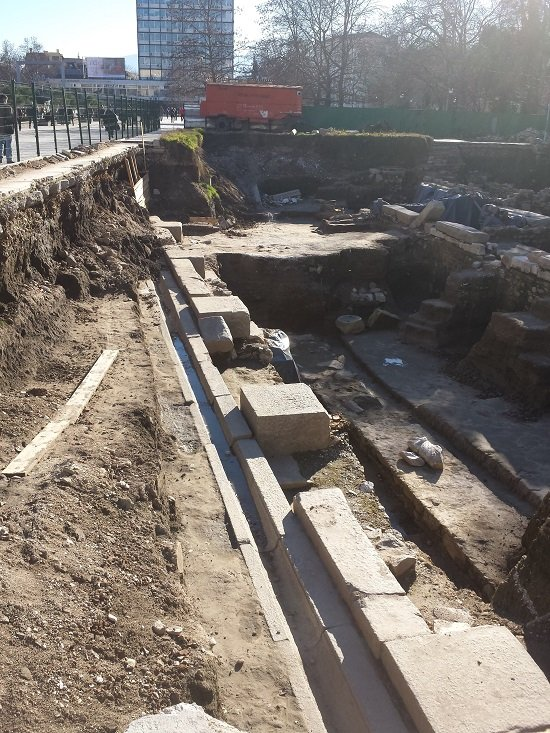
Discovering the western propylaea, 2014

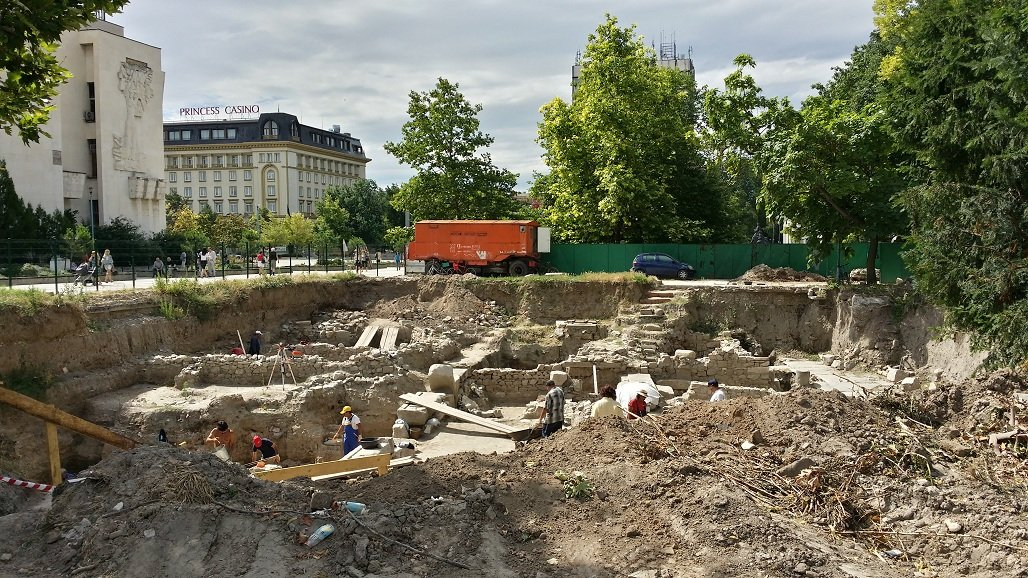
Archeological works, 2014

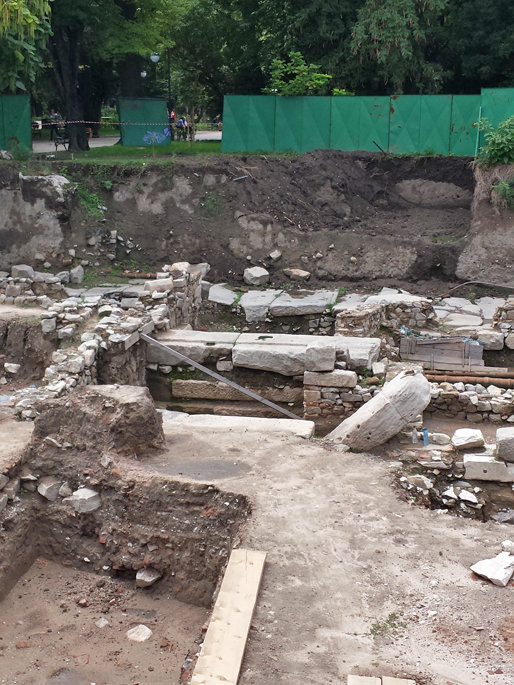
Ancient shops near the western propylaea, 2014
