= The Roman Forum =

Italian magazine

- Type: Roman site
- Publisher: WalEurope
- Editor: Anthony Smith
- Founded: February 2006
- Language: English
- Headquarters: Rome
- Circulation: 15,000
- Sister newspapers: The Florentine
- Website: www.theromanforum.com

The Roman Forum is a monthly magazine sold in and around Rome, Italy with subscribers in countries around the world, including the US, Australia, New Zealand, the UK and the rest of Europe.

It is a full-colour news and general-interest magazine with information and views on cultural aspects and practical life in the city of Rome: art, leisure, travelling, shopping, events, with coverage from Rome and around Italy.

Content is divided into News, Italian Life, Leisure, Culture, Event Listings and Reference. Articles are written by both an in-house editorial team and external contributors.

The first issue of The Roman Forum came out in February 2006. The Roman Forum website was extensively upgraded in April 2009. There is also a forthcoming series of short guides published by the TRF publishing series.

The current editor is Anthony Smith, who has been with Walueurope since 2001, also responsible for the English version of the Tiscali Europe channel. He graduated in contemporary European studies from the University of North London in 1994 followed by post-graduate research on European energy markets at the London School of Economics.

The Roman Forum is owned by Walueurope, a multilingual agency specialised in the design, creation and distribution of information products and communication solutions, with a focus on European and Chinese issues.

It has an independent sister paper in Florence, The Florentine, which provides news and views about the Tuscan capital.
