= Roman Forum (Thessaloniki) =

Archaeological site in Thessaloniki, Greece

Coordinates: 40.638°N 22.946°E

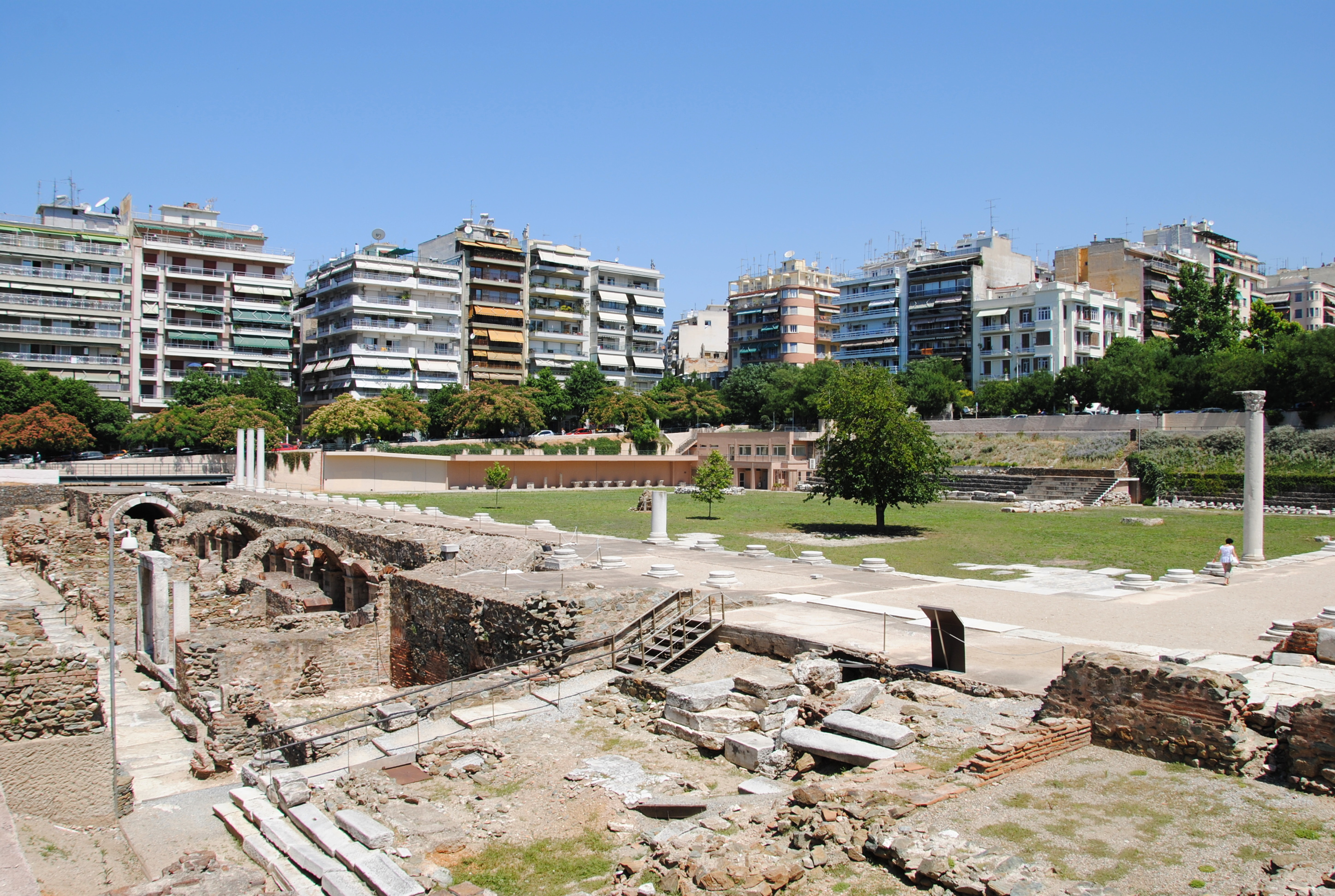
The Roman Forum

The Roman Forum of Thessaloniki is the ancient Roman-era forum of the city, located at the upper side of Aristotelous Square.

It is a large two-terraced forum featuring two-storey stoas, dug up by accident in the 1960s. The forum complex also boasts two Roman baths, one of which has been excavated while the other is buried underneath the city, and a small theater which was also used for gladiatorial games. Although the initial complex was not built in Roman times, it was largely refurbished in the 2nd century. It is believed that the forum and the theater continued to be used until at least the 6th century.

The area of the forum was planned to be the site of the Thessaloniki Municipal Courthouse (in Greek: Δικαστικό Μέγαρο), but after the ruins were discovered during the excavation, the project was scrapped. While the courthouse building was relocated, the intended name of the square ("Courthouse/Dikastirion Square") still survives in popular use. The official name of the square however is "of Ancient Agora (Archaias Agoras)".

== Gallery ==
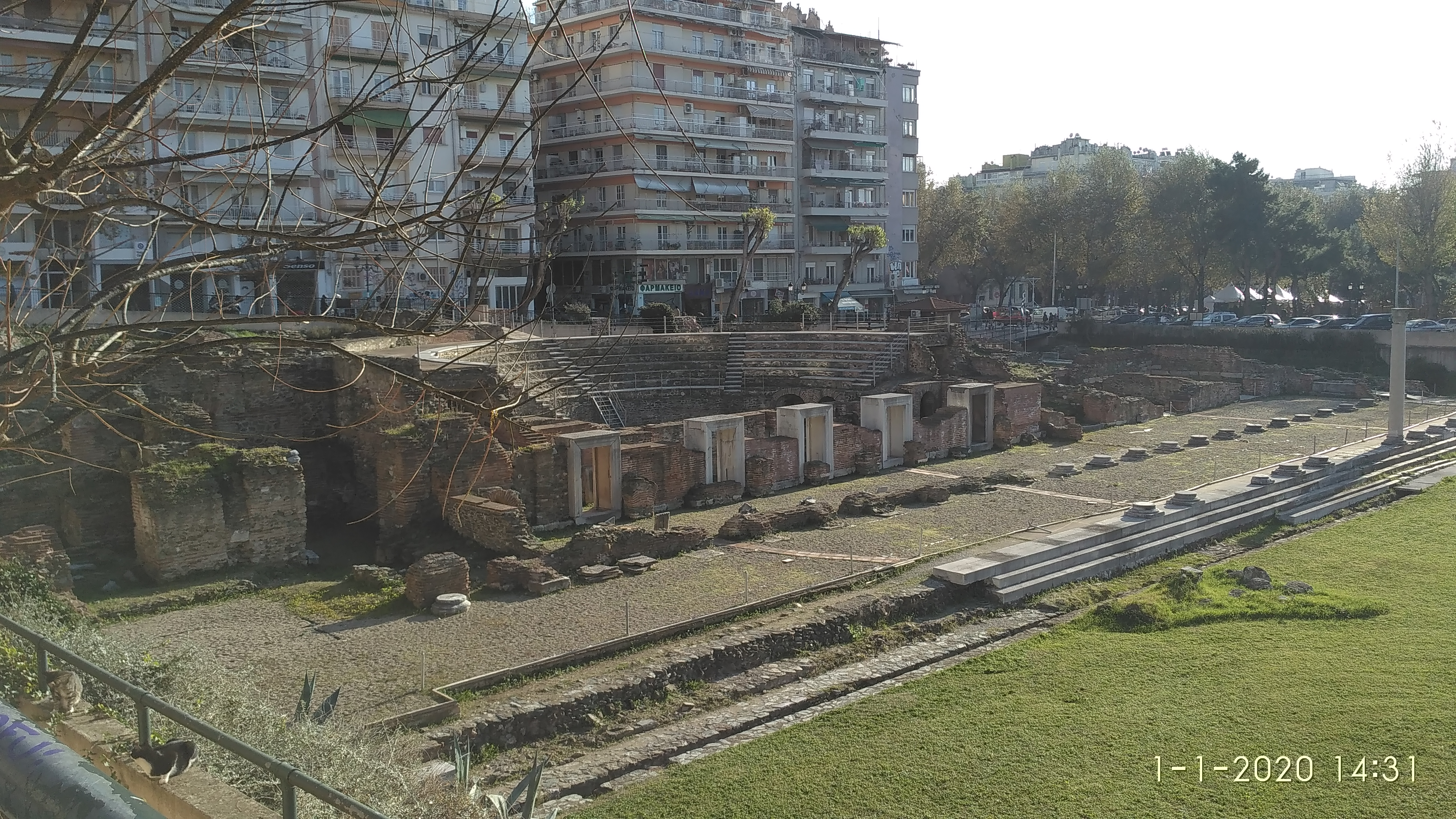
Roman odeon, front view

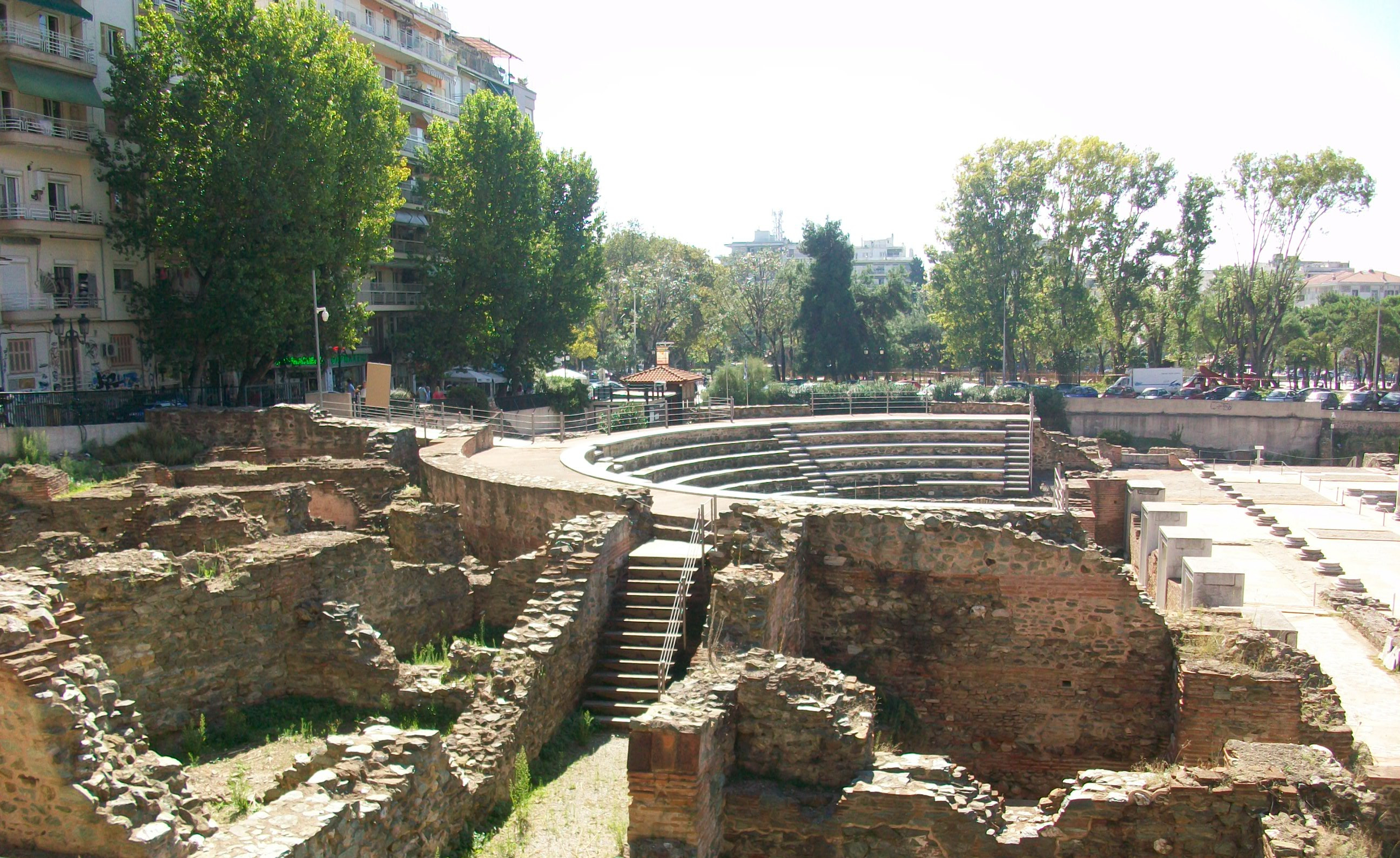
The Roman Odeon

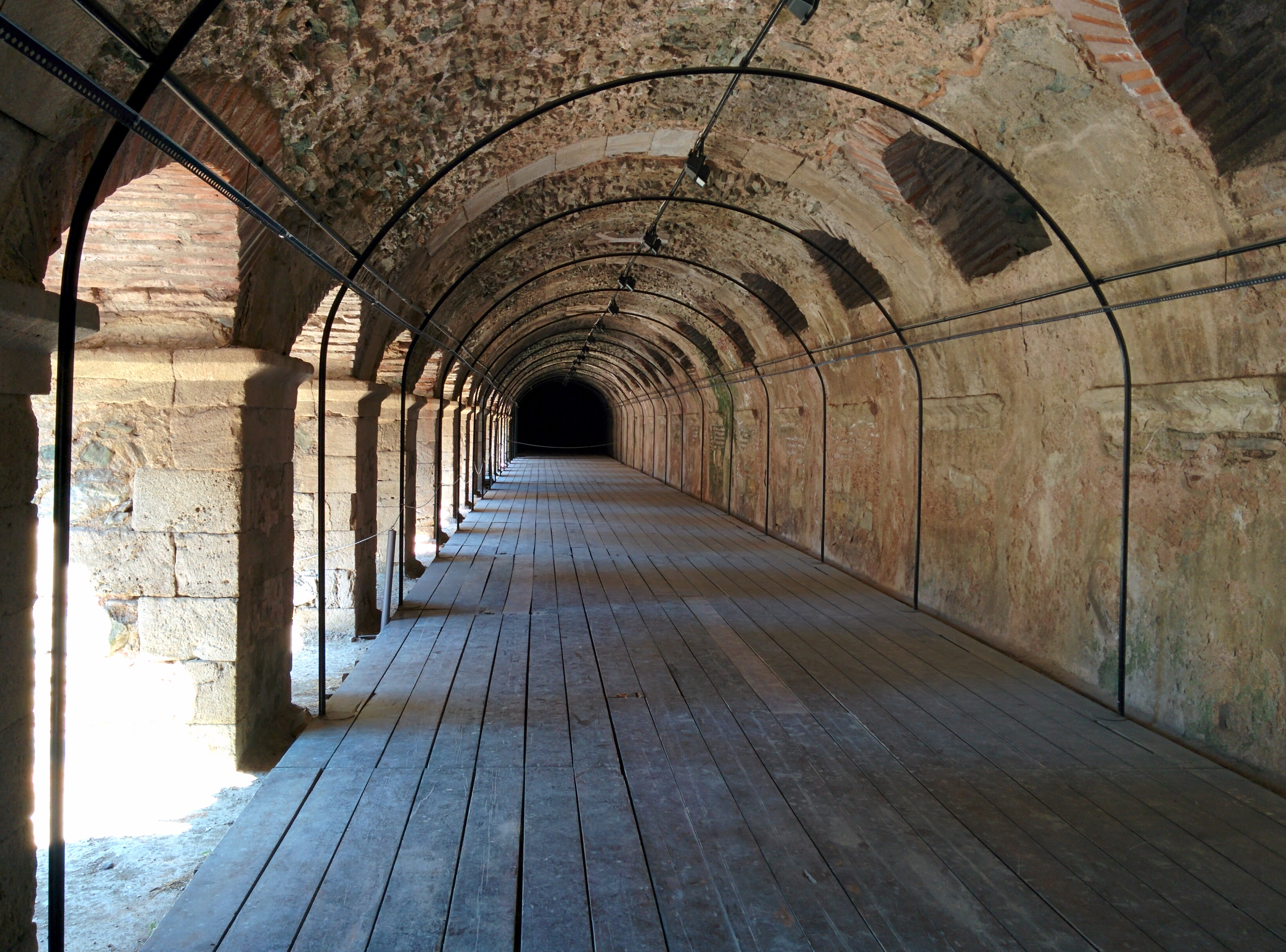
Stoa

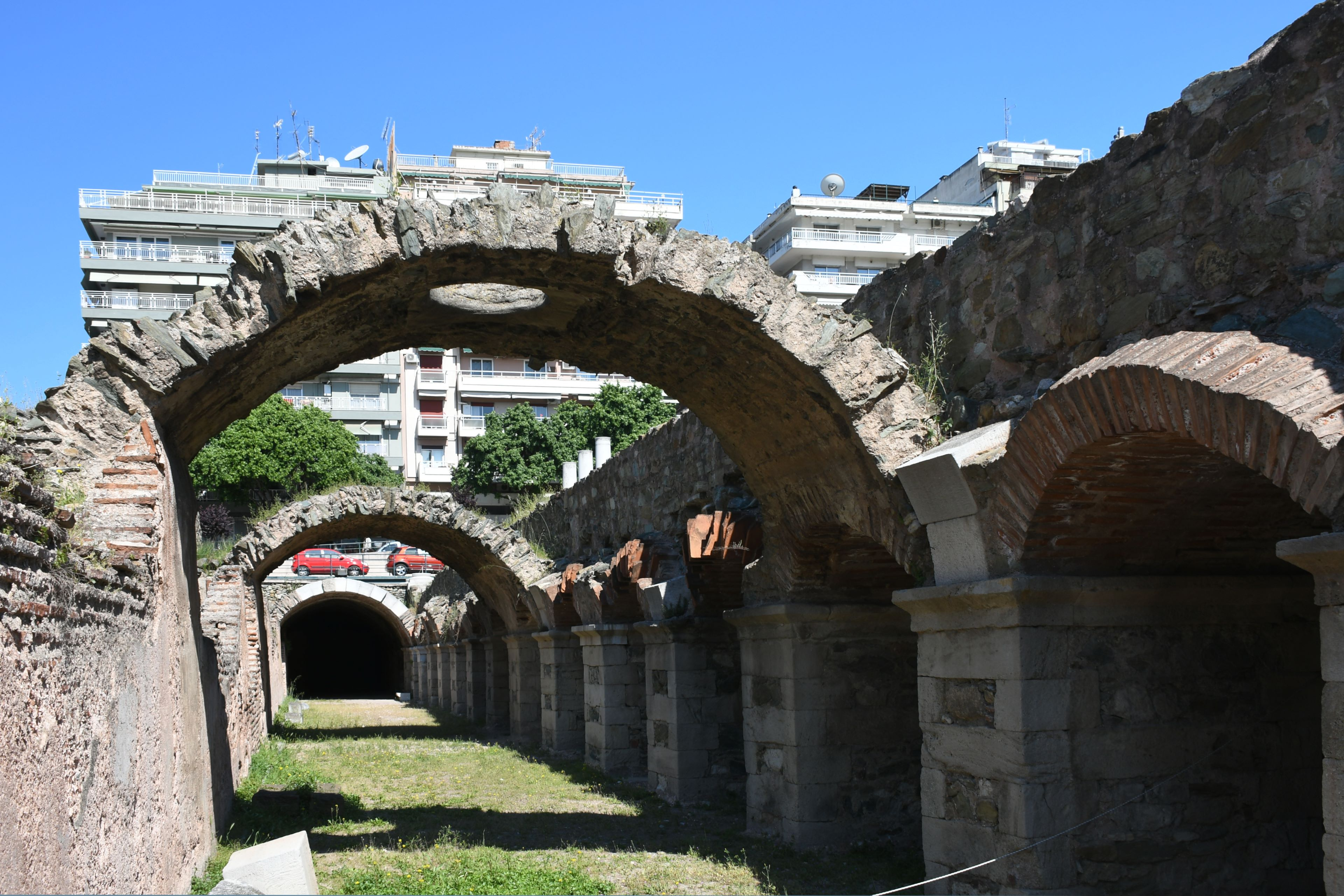
View

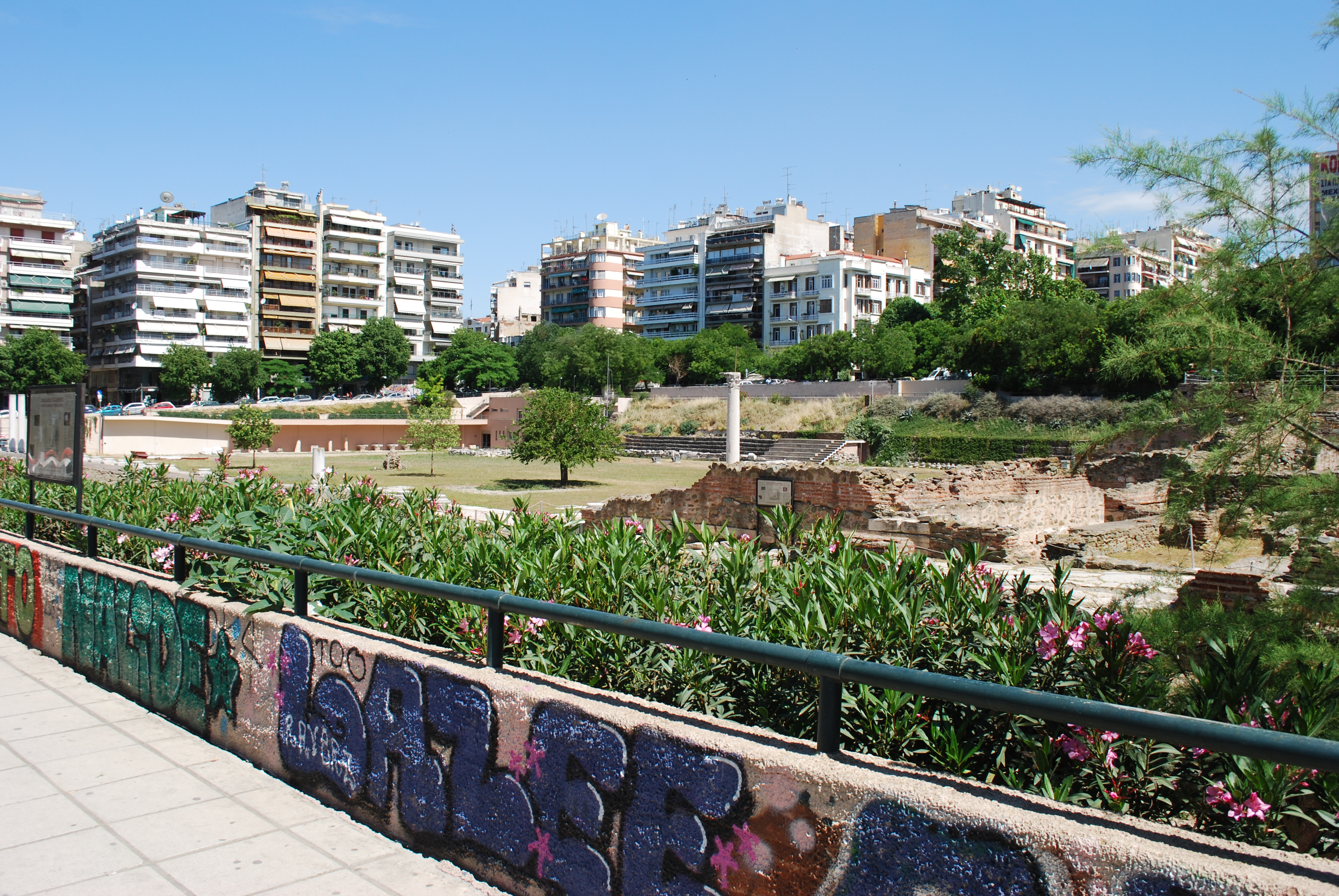
View

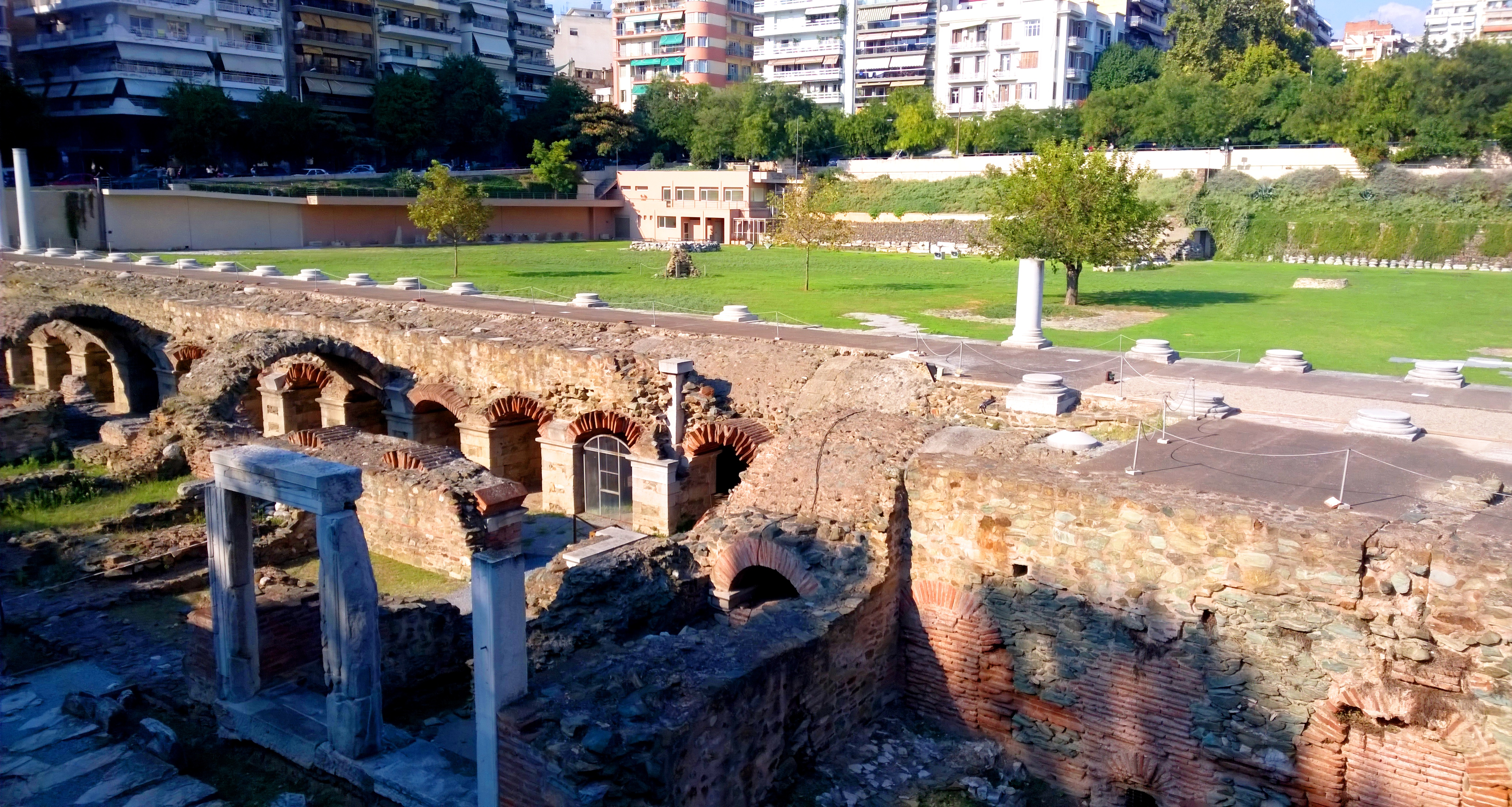
South view

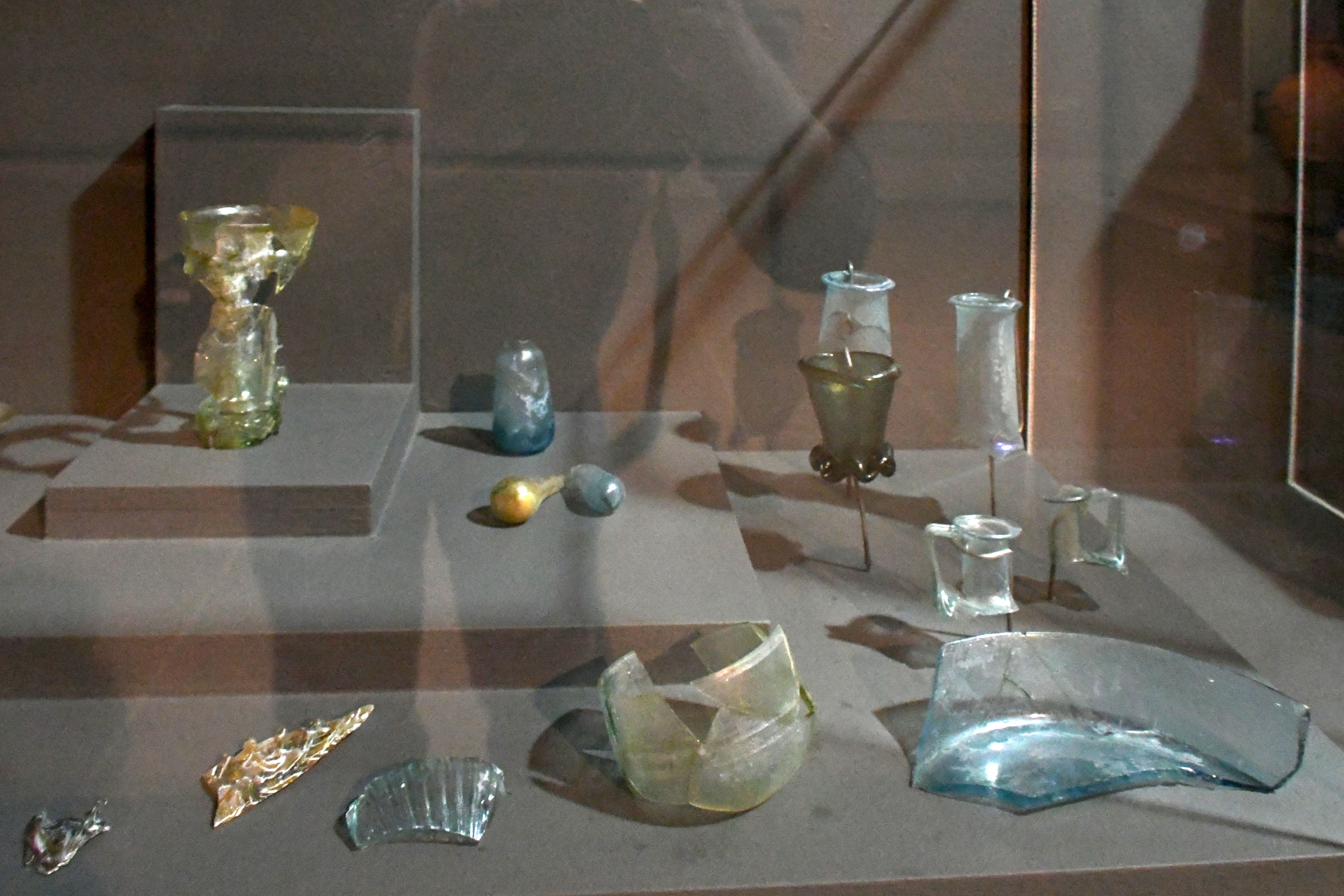
Glass artifacts exhibited in the forum's museum

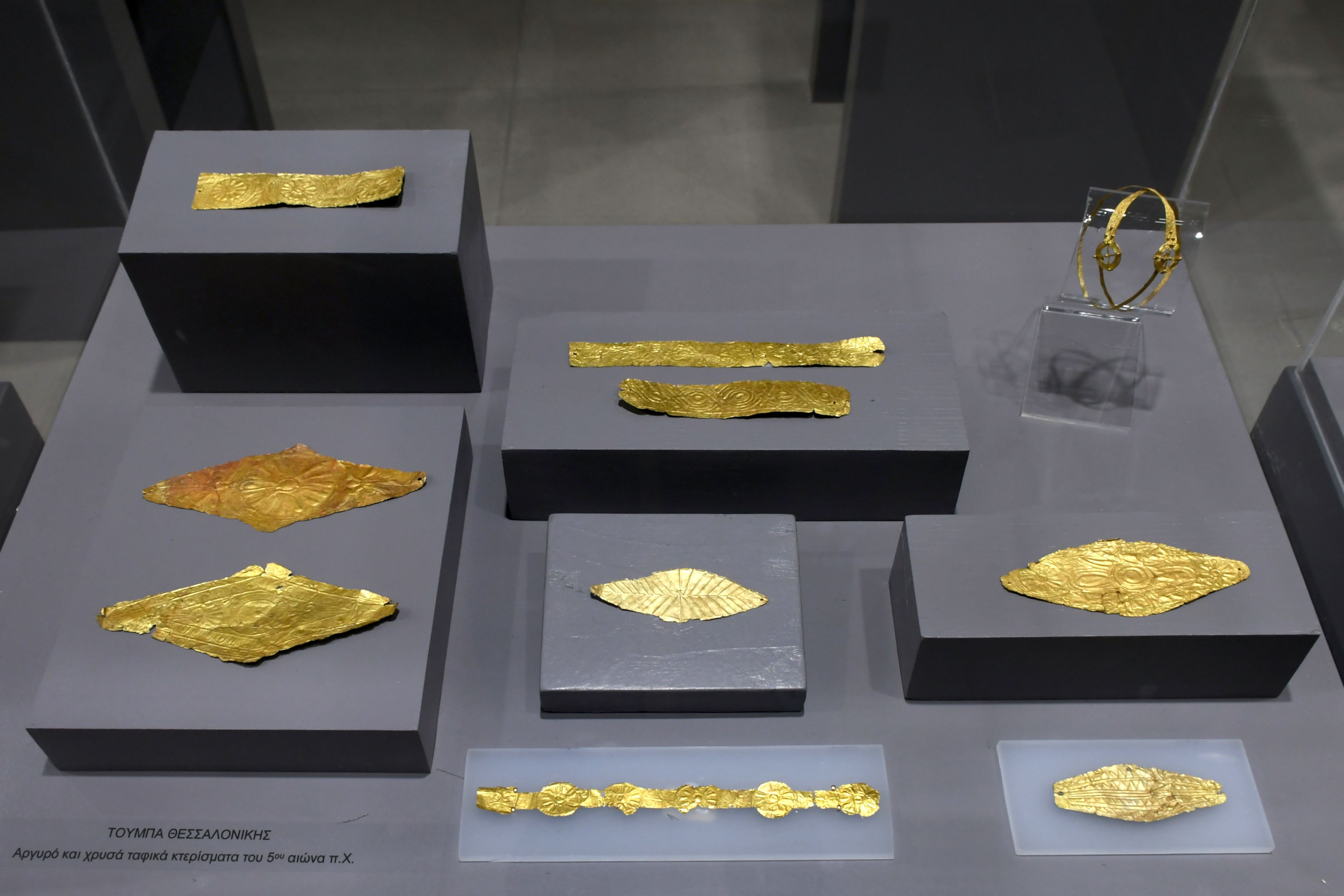
Golden artifacts exhibited in the forum's museum

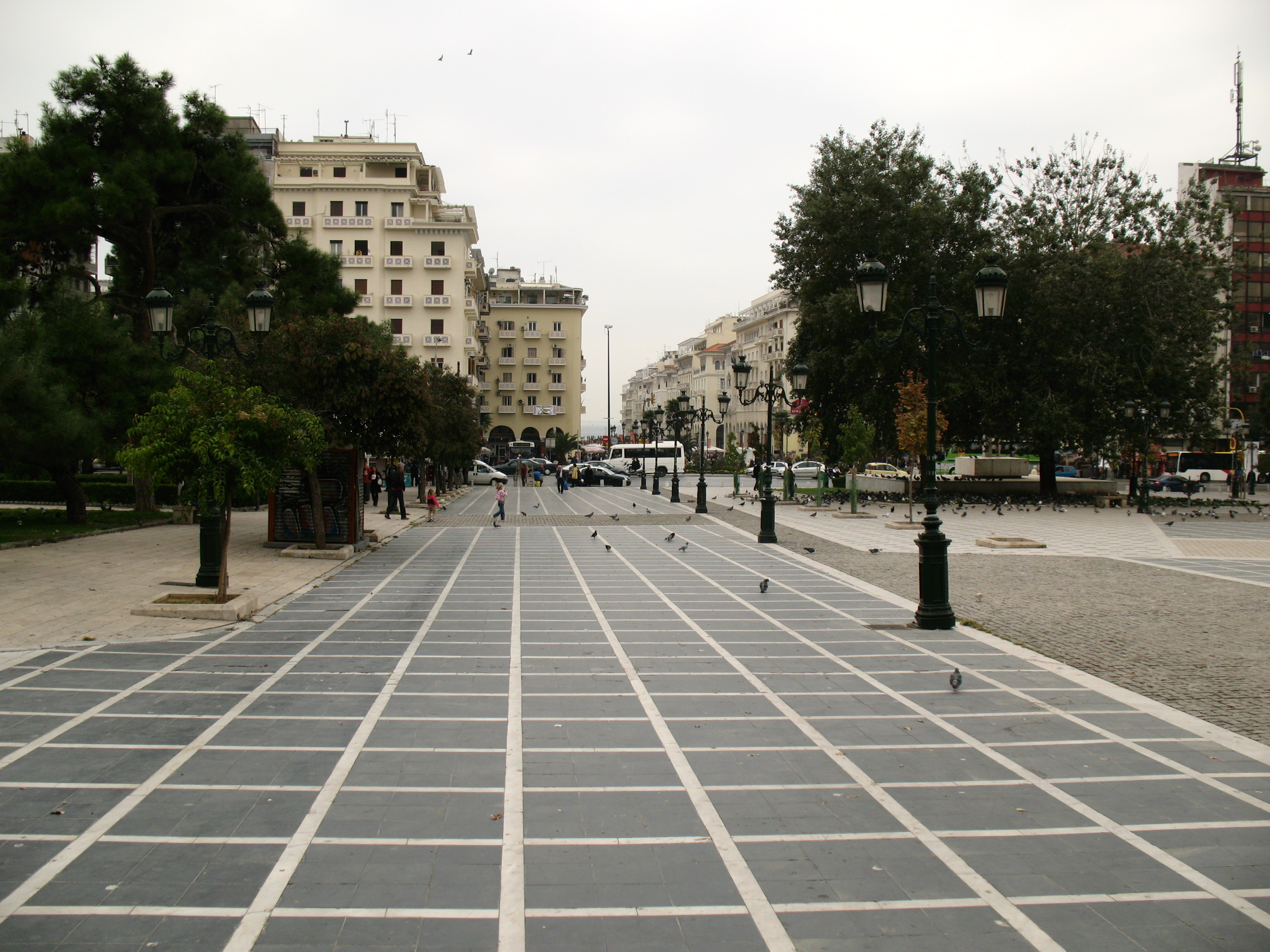
The square

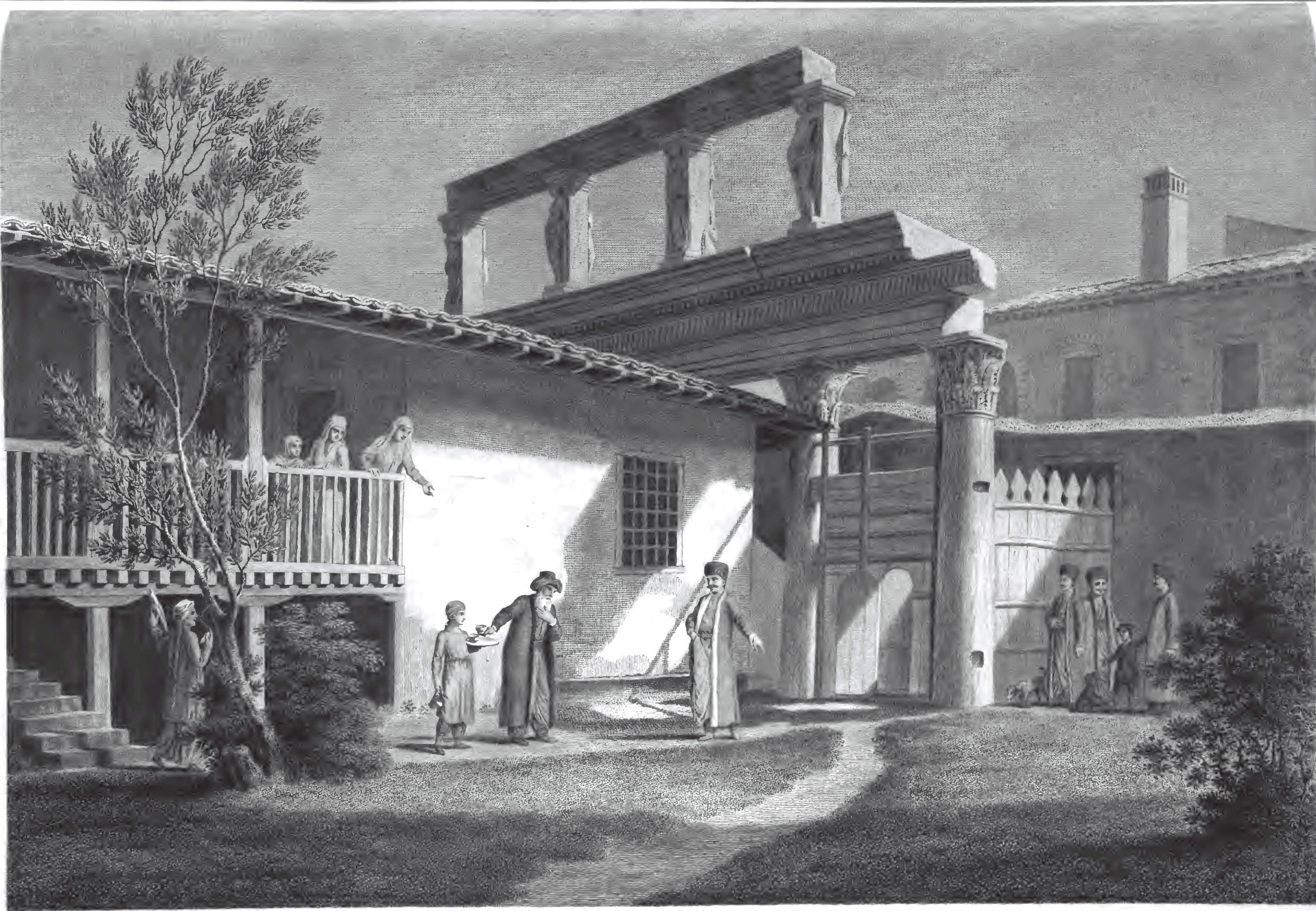
Engraving of Las Incantadas portico, which once stood next to the forum
