= Cynossema =

Cynossema (Ancient Greek: Κυνὸς σῆμα and Κυνόσσημα) and Cynosemon (Κυνόσημον), meaning Dog's gravestone, was a promontory on the eastern coast of the Thracian Chersonesus, near the town of Madytus. It was near the modern town of Kilidülbahir.

== History ==
In antiquity, it was regarded as the burial place of the Trojan queen Hecuba. After the sack of Troy and the deaths of her children, she had been transformed into a dog and stoned by the Achaeans. In another version of the myth she threw herself into the sea.

Euripides' play Hecuba concludes with a prophecy that her tomb "will be called by the name Poor Dog's Tomb, a landmark for sailors."

The naval Battle of Cynossema took place there in 411 BC during the Peloponnesian War. The jutting promontory made it hard for ships to navigate, so it has been argued there was a fire beacon on the site since at least the 5th century BC. It was from there the Athenians received signals about the approach of the Peloponnesian fleet.
