= Eunoë =

Nymph, wife of the Phrygian king Dymas

Eunoë (/ˈjuːnoʊiː/; Ancient Greek: Εὐνοη, romanized: Eúnoē) according to Greek mythology, was a naiad-nymph daughter of the river god Sangarius, sometimes associated with Persephone as her mother. Eunoë is the wife of the Phrygian king Dymas, and the mother of Hecuba, the wife of King Priam of Troy. Otherwise, the mother of Hecabe was called the naiad Euagora.
