= Onayemi =

Ọnàyẹmí
- Gender: Male
- Language: Yoruba

Origin
- Origin: Nigerian
- Meaning: Artistry befits me.
- Region of origin: South West, Nigeria

Ọnàyẹmí audio is a Nigerian surname. It is a male name and of Yoruba origin, which means "Artistry befits me.". The name Ọnàyẹmí is common among the Oyo people of the Southwest, Nigeria.

== Notable individuals with the name ==
- Folake Onayemi (1964–2024), a Nigerian literary scholar
- Sydney Onayemi (1937–2016), a Nigerian-Swedish DJ
