= Olakunbi Olasope =

Nigerian classicist (born 1971)

- Olasope at the inauguration of The Classical Association of Ghana, October 2018
- Born: 14 August 1971

Academic background
- Education: University of Ibadan (BA) (MA) (PhD)
- Thesis: The Ideal of Univira in Traditional Marriage Systems in Ancient Rome and Yorubaland (2005)

Academic work
- Discipline: Classics
- Institutions: University of Ibadan

Olakunbi Ojuolape Olasope is a Professor in the Department of Classics at the University of Ibadan in Nigeria. She is an expert on Roman social history, Greek and Roman theatre, and Yoruba classical performance culture. Olasope is known in particular for her work on the reception of classical drama in West Africa, especially the work of the Nigerian dramatist Femi Osofisan.

== Education ==
Olasope studied Classics at the University of Ibadan, completing her BA in 1991 and MA in 1994. Her doctoral thesis, The Ideal of Univira in Traditional Marriage Systems in Ancient Rome and Yorubaland, was awarded in 2005. ("Univira" is the Latin word for a woman married only ever to one man, see Pudicitia.) In 2002, she was a visiting scholar at the Department of Classics of the University of Texas at Austin.

== Career ==
Olasope began teaching at the University of Ibadan as an Assistant Lecturer in 1997. She was promoted to Lecturer II in 1999, Lecturer I in 2004, Senior Lecturer in 2007 and became a Reader in 2013. She became a Full Professor of Classics in 2016. She was the Head (Chair) of the Department of Classics between 2009 and 2014, and again between 2020 and 2024. In 2005/2006, she held a University of Ibadan Senate Research Grant. She was a British Academy Visiting Fellow at Oriel College, Oxford in 2007 and an Academic Visitor at the Aristotle University of Thessaloniki, Greece in Spring 2010. She has also been a visiting scholar at the University of Reading. In 2017-19 Olasope was a visiting scholar at the University of Ghana, Legon. Olasope is an institutional member of the Classical Reception Studies Network for the University of Ibadan and participated in the African Blog Takeover in 2021.

Olasope has published extensively on Roman social history and comparative studies of Roman and Yoruba social history. Olasope's work focuses principally on the position of women in Ancient Roman and Yoruba society, and those societies' views on the virtue of women. Additionally, Olasope's comparative work on Roman and Nigerian material culture resulted in her 2009 monograph Roman Jewelleries, Benin Beads for Class Structures: Significance of Adornment in Ancient Cultures.

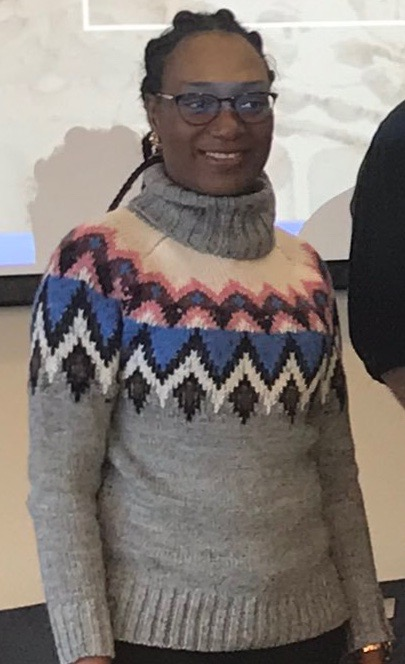
Olakunbi Olasope at the conference "Classical Antiquity and Local Identities: from Newfoundland to Nigeria and Ghana", Memorial University, 2019

Olasope is primarily known for her work on modern West African drama which draws on classical themes and precedents. She is a significant contributor to work on the Nigerian playwright Femi Osofisan, on whom she co-convened a major international conference in 2016. Olasope also edited a volume of interviews with Osofisan, described by one reviewer as containing some 'very valuable' interviews and playing an important role in making Osofisan's works more widely available. Olasope has written a series of articles on Osofisan's work, focusing on the use of plays by Sophocles and Euripides in modern Nigerian drama and literature, particularly focusing on The Trojan Women and Women of Owu. Olasope's work on Osofisan and classical reception is widely recognised in Nigerian media sources. In 2021, Olasope worked with Femi Osofisan on a production based on Euripides' Medea: "Medaaye: A Re-Reading for the African Stage of Euripides’ Medea."

Olasope has worked to promote the study of Classics in West Africa through the promotion of Classics in secondary schools in Ibadan, Nigeria, but more significantly with the Classical Association of Ghana by co-organising the Association's founding conference on 'Classics and Global Humanities in Ghana'. At this conference the keynote speaker Barbara Goff noted the challenges the departments in Ghana have faced in establishing themselves as centres of research and teaching in the classics and that the very existence of the conference underlines how classics has become a more global discipline over the past few years. Olasope's work promoting the study of classics and its relevance in West Africa has been featured in the Nigerian and Ghanaian media. A virtual conference, "Pushing the Frontier of Classical Studies in Sub-Saharan Africa: Tribute to PROF OLAKUNBI OLASOPE@50" was held in Olasope's honour in 2021 to celebrate her 50th birthday and contribution to classical studies in Nigeria.

== Select publications ==
- 2001. 'The Roman Slave and His Prospects in the Late Republic and Early Empire' Castalia Vol. 6, 63–71.
- 2002. 'Greek and Yoruba Beliefs in Sophocles' Antigone and Femi Osofisan's Adaptation, Tegonni' in Papers in Honour of Tekena N. Tamuno ed. Egbe Ifie 408–420.
- 2004. 'The extent of the powers of the paterfamilias and Olori-ebi in Ancient Roman and Yoruba Cultures,' in Wole Soyinka @70 Festschrift, LACE Occasional Publications Series 22, 809–836.
- 2004. 'Gender Discriminations in Classical Rome. Ibadan Journal of European Studies. No. 4, 80–95.
- 2005. 'Differential Equations: Bride-Price and Dowry in Ancient Roman and Yoruba Cultures.' Nigeria and the Classics Vol.21, 71–77.
- 2006. Marriage Alliances in Ancient Rome. Ibadan: Hope Library of Liberal Arts Series.
- 2009. 'Univira: The Ideal Roman Matrona' Lumina, Vol. 20, No.2, 1–18. ISSN 2094-1188
- 2009. 'The Extent of the Powers of the Paterfamilias and Olori-ebi in Ancient Greek and Yoruba Cultures' Drumspeak: International Journal of Researching the Humanities 2, 152–169.
- 2009. Roman Jewellries, Benin Beads for Class Structures: Significance of Adornment in Ancient Cultures. Ibadan: Hope Library of Liberal Arts Series ISBN 9789788080473
- 2010. 'Women in the Oikos: Re-thinking Greek Male Anxiety over Female Sexuality', in Language, Literature and Criticism: Essays in Honour of Aduke Adebayo, 473-486 (Zenith Bookhouse Publishers).
- 2011. 'The Augustan Social Reforms of 18 BC and the Elite Roman Women.' Drumspeak: International Journal of Researching the Humanities 4, 252–266.
- 2011. with S Adeyemi, 'Fracturing the Insularity of the Global State: War and Conflict in Moira Buffini's Welcome to Thebes.' Lagos Notes and Records 17, 99–110.
- 2012. 'To Sack a City or to Breach a Woman's Chastity: Euripides’ Trojan Women and Osofisan's Women of Owu.' African Performance Review, Journal of African Theatre Association UK 6.1, 111-121
- 2012. 'Prostitution: The Appetites of Athenian Men in the Classical Period.' Lagos Notes and Records 18, 89–104.
- 2012. 'Wailing Women in Ancient Greek Society.' Ife Journal of Foreign Languages 8, 286–297.
- 2012. 'A Review of Omobolanle Sotunsa and Olajumoke Haliso (eds.) Women in Africa: Contexts, Rights, Hegemonies.' Journal of History and Diplomatic Studies 9, 259–265.
- (ed.) 2013. Black Dionysos: Conversations with Femi Osofisan. Ibadan: Kraft Books. ISBN 9789789181094
- 2014. 'Rape and Adultery in Ancient Greek and Yoruba Societies'. Journal of Philosophy and Culture 5.1, 67–114.
- 2015. 'Interview with Femi Osofisan: The Playwright is a Labourer of Love' IATC- International Association of Theatre Critics 12 (University of Illinois at Urbana Champaign)
- 2017. 'Lament as Women's Speech in Femi Osofisan's Adaptation of Euripides’ Trojan Women: Women of Owu.' Textus 7, 105-117
