= Sangarius (mythology) =

Phrygian river-god of Greek mythology, son of Oceanus and Tethys

Sangarius (/sæŋˈɡɛriəs/; Ancient Greek: Σαγγάριος, romanized: Sangários) is a Phrygian river-god of Greek mythology. He is the divine personification of the river Sangarius which flows in Phrygia, a region in northwestern Asia Minor.

== Mythology ==
He is described as the son of the Titans Oceanus and his sister-wife Tethys and as the husband of Metope, by whom he became the father of Hecuba. In some accounts, the mother was called the naiad Evagora. Alternatively, Sangarius had a daughter Eunoë who became the mother of Hecabe by King Dymas. He was also the father of Nana and therefore the grandfather of Attis. By Cybele, Sangarius became the father of Nicaea, mother of Telete by Dionysus. His other children were Sagaritis and Ocyrrhoe.

The Sangarius river in Phrygia (now Sakarya in Asian Turkey) itself is said to have derived its name from one Sangas (Ancient Greek: Σάγγας), who had offended the goddess Rhea and was punished by her by being changed into water.

== See also ==
- Peneus
- Alpheus (deity)
- Agdistis
