= Ilione =

Figure in Greek mythology

In Greek mythology, Ilione or Iliona (Ancient Greek: Ἰλιόνη, romanized: Ilióne) was a Trojan princess who later became a queen of Thrace. She is briefly mentioned in Virgil's Aeneid: Aeneas gives her scepter to Dido.

== Family ==
In the Fabulae by Hyginus, Ilione is listed among the children of King Priam and Queen Hecuba of Troy. Her husband was the Thracian king Polymestor.

== Mythology ==
Ilione played a significant role in a version of the story of her younger brother Polydorus.

She and her husband, Polymestor, were entrusted by her parents to the care of the young prince, Polydorus. Ilione, who already had a son of her own, Deipylus, brought her brother up as her son, and her son as her brother, thinking that if anything happened to one of them, she could return the other one to her parents in any case. So when Polymestor was instigated by the Greeks to kill the son of Priam, he killed Deipylus instead, his own son, taking him for Polydorus. The real Polydorus thus survived and escaped. Later, he went to inquire the oracle at Delphi about his parents, and was answered that his native city had been destroyed, father killed and mother enslaved. Still thinking that he was the son of Polymestor and Ilione, Polydorus thought that the oracle must have been wrong and asked Ilione about it. She told him all the truth and suggested that he should take revenge on Polymestor; Polydorus then blinded and killed him.

Ilione was said to have eventually committed suicide, grieving at her parents' deaths.

Her story was the subject of early Roman tragedies by Pacuvius and Accius.
