= Alexander (play) =

Lost Ancient Greek tragedy by Euripides

- Paris flees from Deiphobus, taking refuge at an altar. Etruscan cinerary urn, Volterra, 2nd century BC.
- Original language: Classical Greek
- Written by: Euripides
- Chorus: Trojan herdsmen
- Characters: Paris Alexander; Hecuba; Cassandra; Priam; Deiphobus; Hector; Agelaus
- Genre: Tragedy
- Setting: Troy

Premiere
- Date: 415 BC
- Place: Athens

Alexander (Ancient Greek: Ἀλέξανδρος, romanized: Aléxandros) is an ancient Greek tragedy by the Athenian playwright Euripides. Now lost, it concerned the exposure and recognition of the Trojan prince Paris.

== Background ==
The Alexander was first staged in 415 BC as the opening play of Euripides' so-called "Trojan Trilogy." This consisted of the Alexander, the Palamedes, and the extant Trojan Women, as well as the satyr play Sisyphus. Each centered different events around the Trojan War. They were performed together, however all but the Trojan Women has been lost.

The Alexander explored the relationship between social status and character, nomos and physis. Sophocles had also written a lost Alexander, likely before Euripides and with a similar plot. Later, the Latin playwright Ennius wrote one drawing from Euripides' play.

== Plot ==
Whilst the text itself is fragmentary, a summary of the tragedy's plot was discovered on a piece of papyrus in 1974. The first line of the play has partially been preserved, ending with "...and famous Ilium."

The Trojan queen Hecuba had ominous dreams before the birth of Paris (also known as Alexander), leading to his exposure on Mount Ida. He was discovered by a herdsman who brought him up as his own son. Mourning for her child, Hecuba convinced her husband Priam to establish games in his honor.

Twenty years later, Paris was brought before King Priam by his fellow shepherds for behaving arrogantly as a slave. He defended himself well before the king and was allowed to participate in the games. There, he won the footrace and pentathlon, overcoming even the princes. Outraged at having been defeated by a slave, Prince Deiphobus plotted to kill him. His brother Hector argued against this course of action. Paris took refuge at an altar, where his true identity was revealed by the prophet Cassandra and his herdsman father. Hecuba was then reunited with her lost son.
