= Women of Owu =

2006 book by Femi Osofisan

- Author: Femi Osofisan
- Language: English
- Genre: Drama
- Published: 2006
- Publisher: University Press PLC
- Publication place: Nigeria
- Media type: Print
- Pages: 78
- ISBN: 978-978-069-026-7

Women of Owu is a 2006 drama written by Femi Osofisan and published through University Press PLC. Adapted from Euripides' The Trojan Women, the book uses the combination of choruses, songs and dance to depict the history of the population of Owu kingdom after a combined military force of Ife, Oyo and Ijebu invaded the city of Owu for seven years killing all of its male inhabitants and children.

== Plot ==
Women of Owu focuses on the aftermath of a 19th-century war-torn Owu Kingdom. It reflects on the pains, depression and agony of the survivors who were only women after the killing of all males in the kingdom by the combined forces of Ife, Oyo and Ijebu. The relationship between Women of Owu and The Trojan Women has been explored by Olakunbi Olasope.

== Characters ==
- Anlugbua
- Lawumi
- Erelu Afin
- Gesinde
- Orisaye
- Adumaadan
- Okunade The Maye
- Iyunloye

== Productions ==
The play premiered at The Theatre Chipping Norton in February 2004 and then embarked on an English and Scottish tour.

== Themes ==
Some dominant themes evident in the play include:

- War and Violence
- Gender Roles and Power
- Resistance and Rebellion
- Trauma and Healing
- Religion and Spirituality

These themes are woven together to create a complex and nuanced exploration of the human experience in the context of war, oppression, and resistance.
