= Dymas of Phrygia =

In Greek mythology, Dymas (Ancient Greek: Δύμας, romanized: Dýmas) was a Phrygian king.

== Mythology ==
The father of Dymas was given as one Eioneus, son of Proteus, by some ancient mythographers. According to Dictys, he was a descendant of Phoenix, son of Agenor, as recounted by Helen to Hecuba to prove their kinship. Dymas' wife was called as Eunoë or the naiad Evagora, a daughter of the river god Sangarius. In fact, Dymas and his Phrygian subjects are closely connected to the River Sangarius, which empties into the Black Sea.

By his wife, Eunoë or Evagora, Dymas was the father of Hecuba (also called Hecabe), wife to King Priam of Troy. King Dymas is also said by Homer to have had a son named Asius, who fought (and died) during the Trojan War - not to be confused with his namesake, Asius son of Hyrtacus, who also fought (and died) before Troy. The scholiasts credited Dymas with another son, named Otreus, who fought the Amazons a generation before the Trojan War.

The etymology of the name Dymas is obscure, although it is probably non-Hellenic.
