= Hecuba =

Spouse of king Priam in Greek mythology

- Queen of Troy
- Member of the Trojan Royal Family
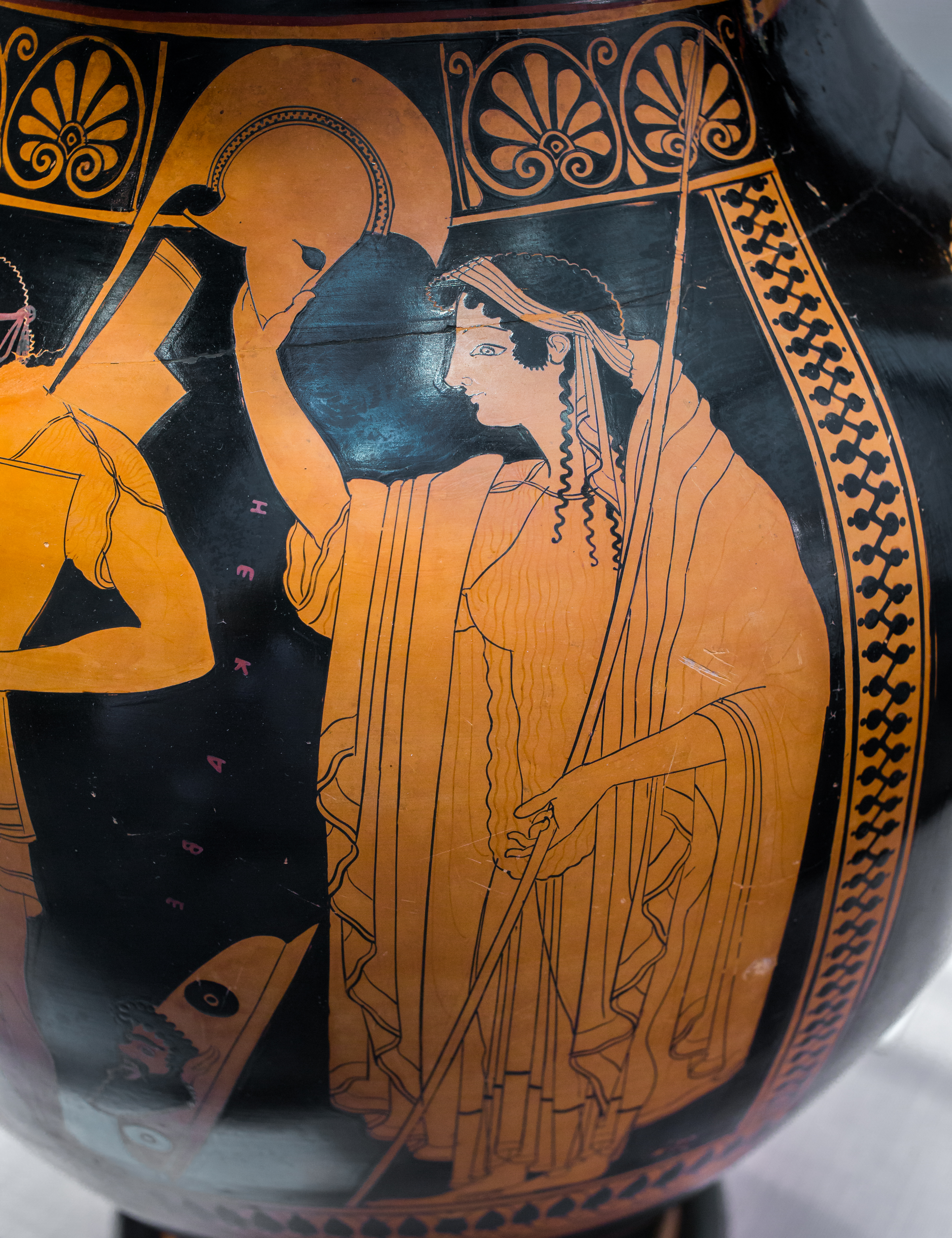
- Hecuba depicted on a vase of the 6th century BC
- Other names: Hecabe, Dymantis
- Abode: Phrygia or Thrace, later Troy

Genealogy
- Parents: (1) Dymas and Euagora or Glaucippe or Eunoë (2) Cisseus and Telecleia (3) Sangarius and Metope or Euagora or Glaucippe
- Siblings: (2) Theano
- Consort: (i) Apollo (ii) Priam
- Offspring: (i) & (ii) Troilus and Hector (ii) Paris, Cassandra, Helenus, Deiphobus, Laodice, Polyxena, Creusa, Polydorus, Polites, Antiphus, Pammon, Hipponous and Iliona

In Greek mythology, Hecuba (/ˈhɛkjʊbə/; also Hecabe; Ancient Greek: Ἑκάβη, romanized: Hekábē, pronounced [hekábɛ:]) was the wife of King Priam and queen of Troy during the Trojan War. With Priam, she was the mother of the warriors Hector and Troilus; Helen's suitor Paris; and the prophetess Cassandra.

== Description ==
In his Chronography, the Byzantine chronicler Malalas described Hecuba as "dark, good eyes, full grown, long nose, beautiful, generous, talkative, calm." Dares the Phrygian described her as "...beautiful, her figure large, her complexion dark. She thought like a man and was pious and just."

== Family ==
=== Parentage ===
Ancient sources vary regarding Hecuba's parentage. According to Homer, Hecuba was the daughter of King Dymas of Phrygia. Euripides and Virgil claimed she was the daughter of the Thracian king Cisseus. The mythographers Pseudo-Apollodorus and Hyginus left the question of her parentage open, with Pseudo-Apollodorus adding a third option: the river god Sangarius and the nymph Metope.

Some versions from non-extant works are summarized by a scholiast on Euripides' Hecuba. According to them, she was a daughter of Dymas or Sangarius by the Naiad Euagora, or by Glaucippe, daughter of Xanthus (Scamander?). The possibility of her being a daughter of Cisseus is also discussed. A scholiast on Homer relates that Hecuba's parents were either Dymas and the nymph Eunoe, or Cisseus and Telecleia; the latter option would make her a full sister of Theano, which is also noted by the scholiast on Euripides cited above.

According to Suetonius in The Twelve Caesars, the emperor Tiberius pestered scholars with obscure questions about ancient mythology, with one of his favorites being "Who was Hecuba's mother?"

=== Offspring ===
Hecuba had 19 children, some of whom included major characters of Homer's Iliad such as the warriors Hector and Paris, as well as the prophetess Cassandra. Two of them, Hector and Troilus, are said to have been born as a result of Hecuba's relationship with the god Apollo. Other named children of Hecuba by Priam are Helenus, Deiphobus, Laodice, Polyxena, Creusa, Polydorus, Polites, Antiphus, Pammon, Hipponous and Iliona.

Comparative table of Hecuba's family
Relation	Names	Sources								
Relation	Names	Hom.	Euripides		Diod.	Virgil	Ovid	Apollod.		Dictys
Relation	Names	Iliad	TW	Hec.	Diod.	Aen.	Met.	Apollod.		Dictys
Parents	Dymas	✓					✓	✓		✓
Parents	Cisseus			✓		✓		✓		
Parents	Sangarius and Metope							✓		
Consort	Priam	✓	✓	✓	✓	✓	✓	✓		✓
Consort	Apollo								✓	
Siblings	Asius	✓								✓
Children	Hector	✓	✓		✓		✓	✓		
Children	Deiphobus	✓						✓		
Children	Polyxena		✓	✓			✓	✓		✓
Children	Cassandra	✓	✓	✓				✓		✓
Children	Polydorus	✓		✓			✓	✓		✓
Children	Paris	✓	✓			✓		✓		✓
Children	Creusa							✓		
Children	Laodice	✓						✓		
Children	Helenus	✓						✓		
Children	Pammon	✓						✓		
Children	Polites	✓						✓		
Children	Antiphus	✓						✓		
Children	Troilus	✓						✓	✓	

== Myths ==
=== Before the Trojan war ===
Whilst pregnant with Paris, Hecuba dreamt she had given birth to a flaming torch which destroyed Troy. The seer Aesacus interpreted that the child soon to be born would cause the city's downfall. In one account, before he was exposed on Mount Ida, it was Hecuba who named the boy Paris.

Paris recognized by his family on an alabaster urn, c. 100 BC

Hecabe mourned her presumed dead son for twenty years. She convinced her husband Priam to set up annual funeral games in his memory. It was at one of these games that a slave defeated all the princes, her sons. Prince Deiphobus asked his mother to help him plan the slave's downfall, however it was later revealed the youth was actually Paris who had been rescued and raised by herdsmen. He was welcomed back to the palace.

In Dictys of Crete's account, after arriving in Troy with Paris, the Spartan queen Helen was welcomed by Hecuba. It was at her insistence that Priam went to greet Helen kindly and inquire about her. When Hecuba heard that Helen had begged not to be returned to Greece, she embraced the woman and persuaded the other Trojans to comply with her wishes. Byzantine chroniclers Malalas and Tzetzes record that Hecuba was struck by Helen's beauty, kissed her, and held her in high esteem.

At some point, Hecuba became the lover of the god Apollo. Some sources claim he was the father of her sons Hector or Troilus.

=== Hecuba in the Iliad ===
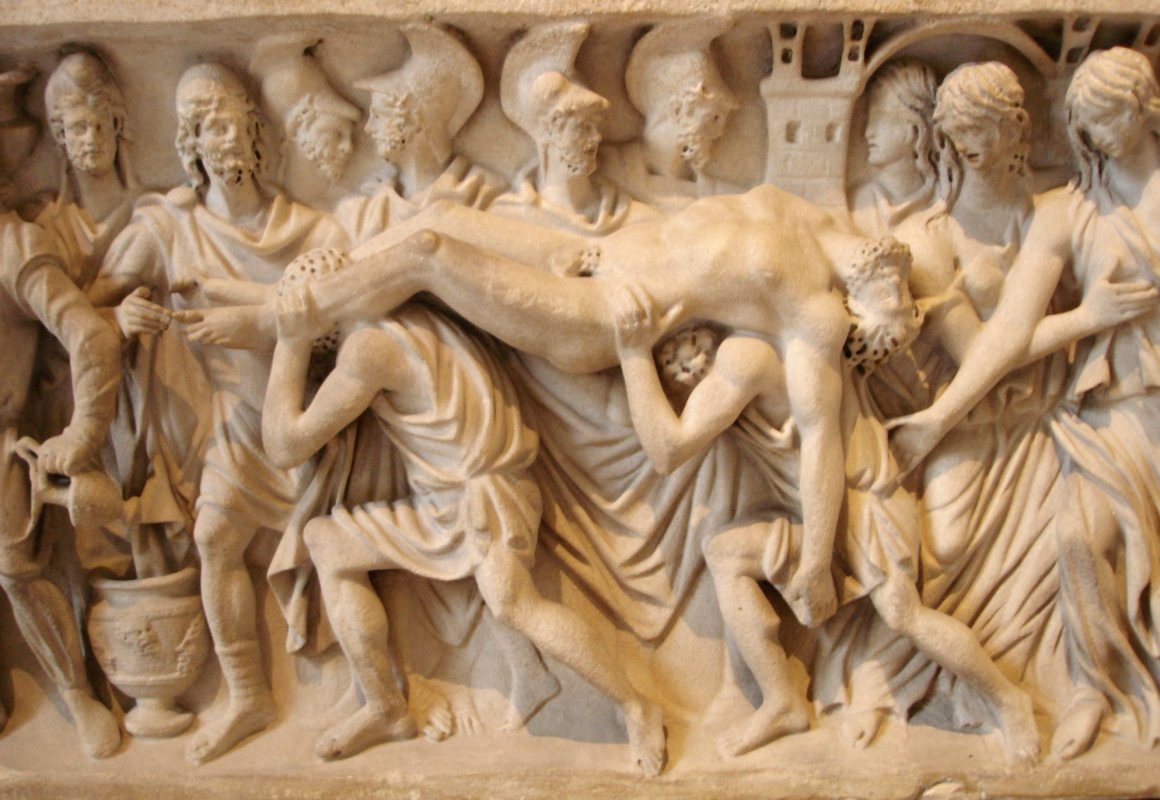
The death of Hector on a Roman sarcophagus, c. 200 AD

Hecuba appears six times in the Iliad. In Book 6 (ln. 326–96), she meets Hector upon his return to the city and offers him the libation cup, instructing him to offer it to Zeus and to drink from it himself. Taking Hector's advice, she chooses a gown taken from Alexander's treasure to give as an offering to the goddess and leads the Trojan women to the temple of Athena to pray for help. In Book 22, she pleads with Hector not to fight Achilles, expressing her premonition of "never get[ting] to mourn you laid out on a bier." In Book 24 (ln. 201–16), the final one of the poem, she is stricken with anxiety upon hearing of Priam's plan to retrieve Hector's body from Achilles' hut. Further along in the same episode, at 24 (ln. 287–98), she offers Priam the libation cup and instructs him to pray to Zeus so that he may receive a favourable omen upon setting out towards the Achaean camp. Unlike in the first episode in which Hector refuses her offer of the cup, Priam accepts and is rewarded with the requested omen. Finally, with Priam returning to the city having recovered Hector's body, Hector is laid to burial and Hecuba laments her son's death in a well-known speech in the end of the book (ln. 748–59).

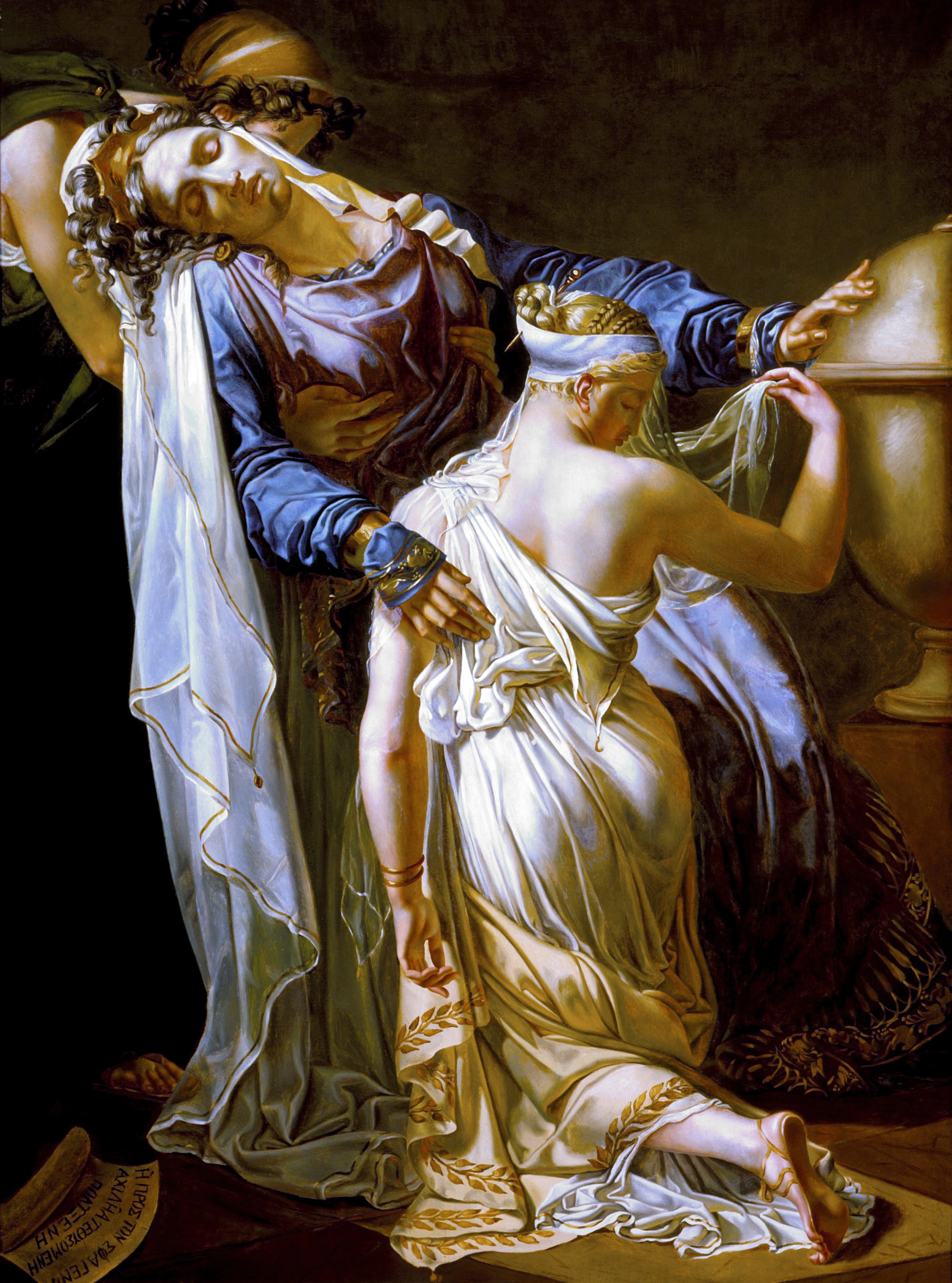
Hecuba and Polyxena by Merry-Joseph Blondel

=== Hecuba in other classical works ===
Stesichorus states that after the sack of Troy, Apollo, Hecuba's former lover, took her to safety and placed her in Lycia.

The Bibliotheca (Library) of Pseudo-Apollodorus states that Hecuba had a son named Troilus with the god Apollo. An oracle prophesied that Troy would not be defeated if Troilus reached the age of 20 alive. Troilus is killed by Achilles.

Hecuba is a main character in two plays by Euripides: The Trojan Women and Hecuba. The Trojan Women describes the aftermath of the fall of Troy, including Hecuba's enslavement by Odysseus. Hecuba also takes place just after the fall of Troy. Polydorus, the youngest son of Priam and Hecuba, is sent to King Polymestor for safekeeping, but when Troy falls, Polymestor murders Polydorus. Hecuba learns of this, and when Polymestor comes to the fallen city, Hecuba, by trickery, blinds him and kills his two sons.

Another story says that when she was given to Odysseus as a slave, she snarled and cursed at him, so the gods turned her into a dog, allowing her to escape. Hecuba, as a dog, is later taken in by Hecate as one of her Familiars.

In another tradition Hecuba went mad upon seeing the corpses of her children Polydorus and Polyxena. Dante described this episode, which he derived from Italian sources:

E quando la fortuna volse in basso
l'altezza de' Troian che tutto ardiva,
sì che 'nsieme col regno il re fu casso,
Ecuba trista, misera e cattiva,
poscia che vide Polissena morta,
e del suo Polidoro in su la riva
del mar si fu la dolorosa accorta,
forsennata latrò sì come cane...

And when fortune overturned the pride
of the Trojans, who dared everything, so that
both the king and his kingdom were destroyed,
Poor wretched captured Hecuba,
after she saw her Polyxena dead
and found her Polydorus on the beach,
was driven mad by sorrow
and began barking like a dog...

—Inferno XXX: 13–20

Another legend has it that Hecuba threw herself into the sea and was transformed into "a she-dog with fiery eyes" and that she was buried in a "wretched" place called Kynosema ('dog's grave'), a "landmark for sailors". The Kynosema is said to be a promontory located in modern day Kilidülbahir. According to Lycophron, she was rescued by the goddess Hecate and became one of her canine familiars.

Ptolemy Chennus, noted for his work "abounding in extraordinary and badly imagined information," claimed that Helen and Paris had a daughter, whom they named Helen after her mother won a game of knucklebones to decide the child's name. He adds that Hecuba killed the girl when Troy fell.

In an epigram attributed to Plato and preserved in the Greek Anthology and written in memory of Dio of Syracuse, Plato writes that the Fates shed tears for Hecuba and the Trojan women from the very hour of their birth. He uses their tragic destiny as a reflection of Dio's own fate, suggesting that even those who achieve greatness cannot escape the suffering that fate may bring.

== Gallery ==
Hecuba Offering the Robe to Pallas by Antonio Canova

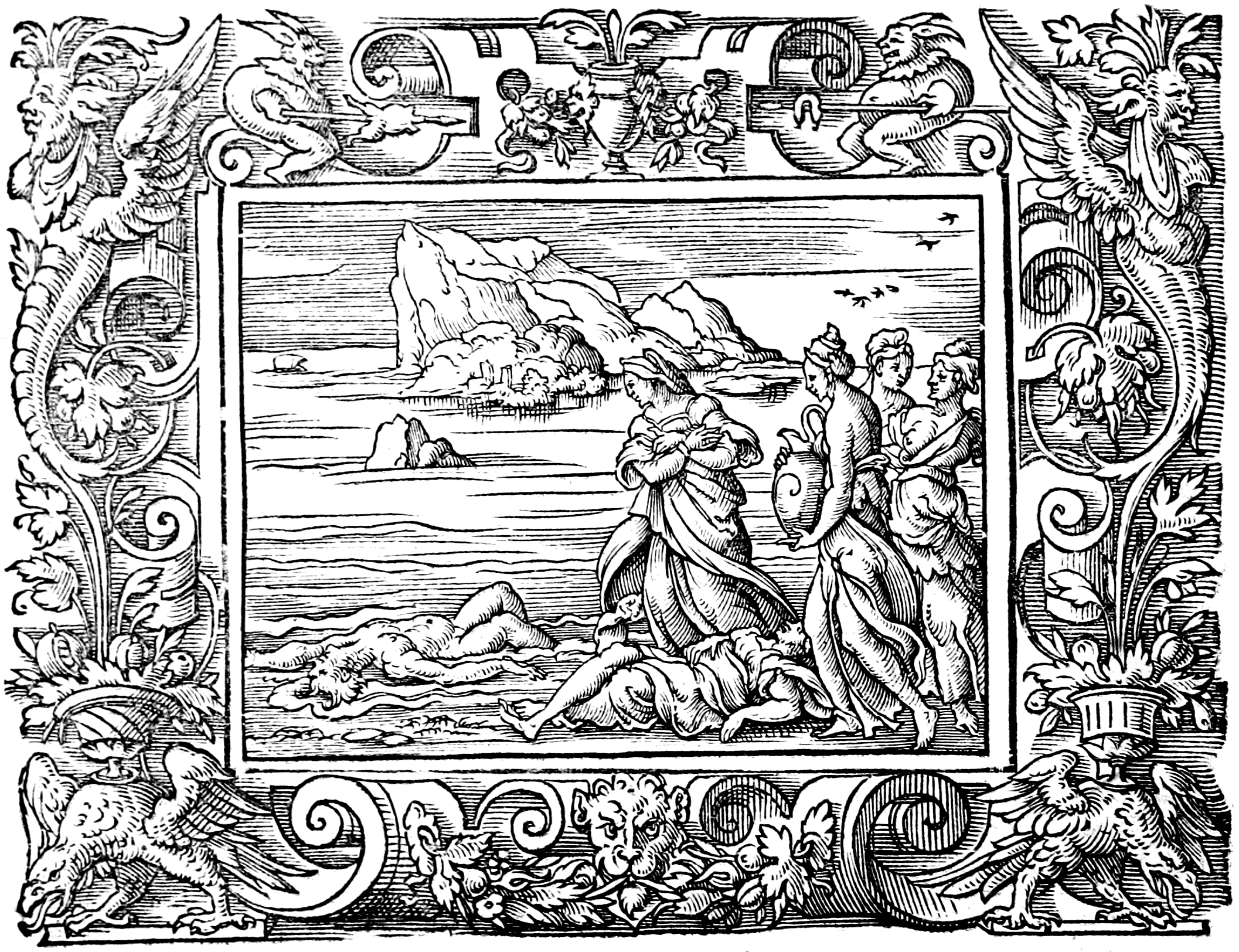
Hecuba finds her son Polydorus by Virgil Solis

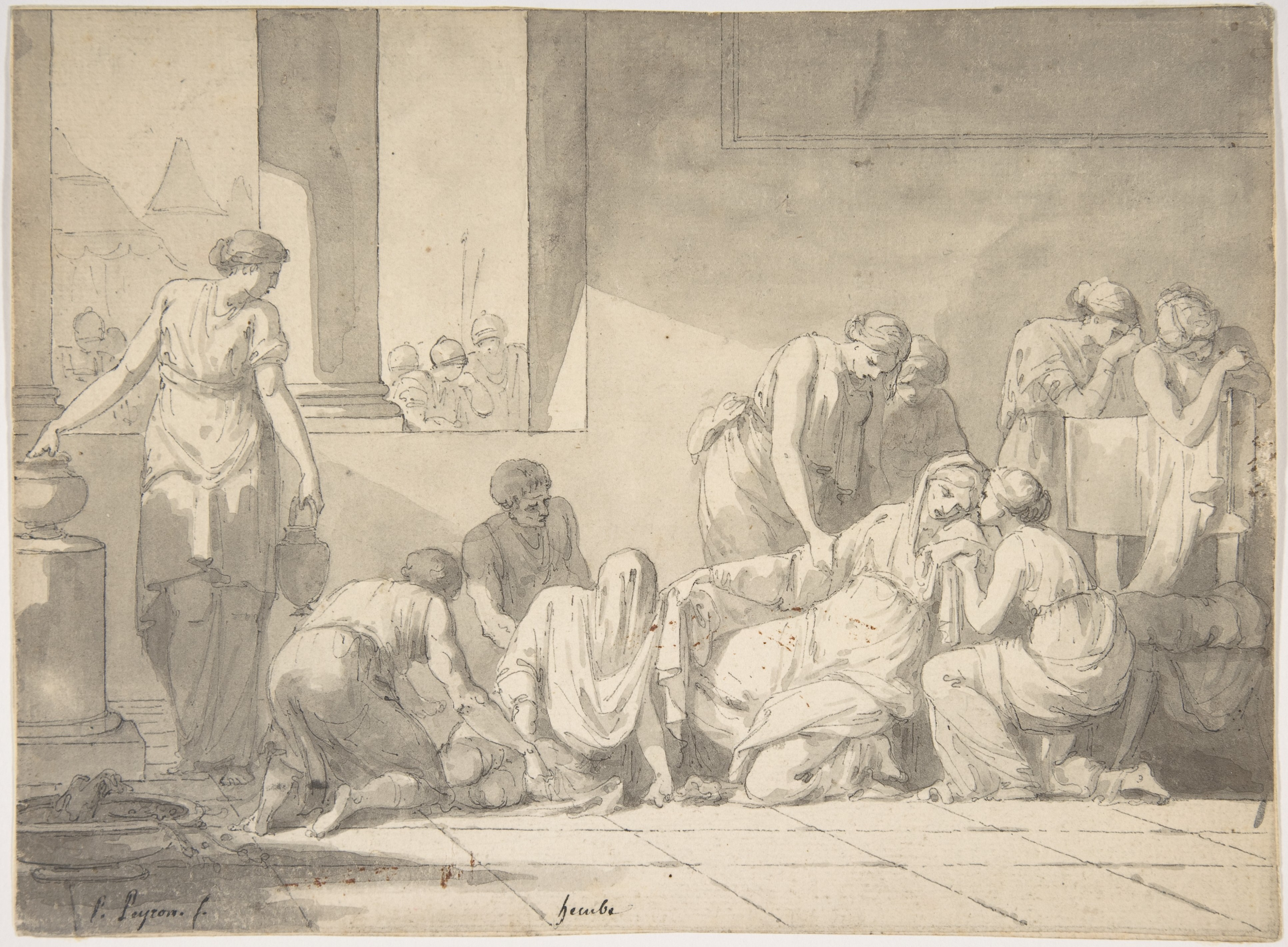
Despair of Hecuba by Pierre Peyron

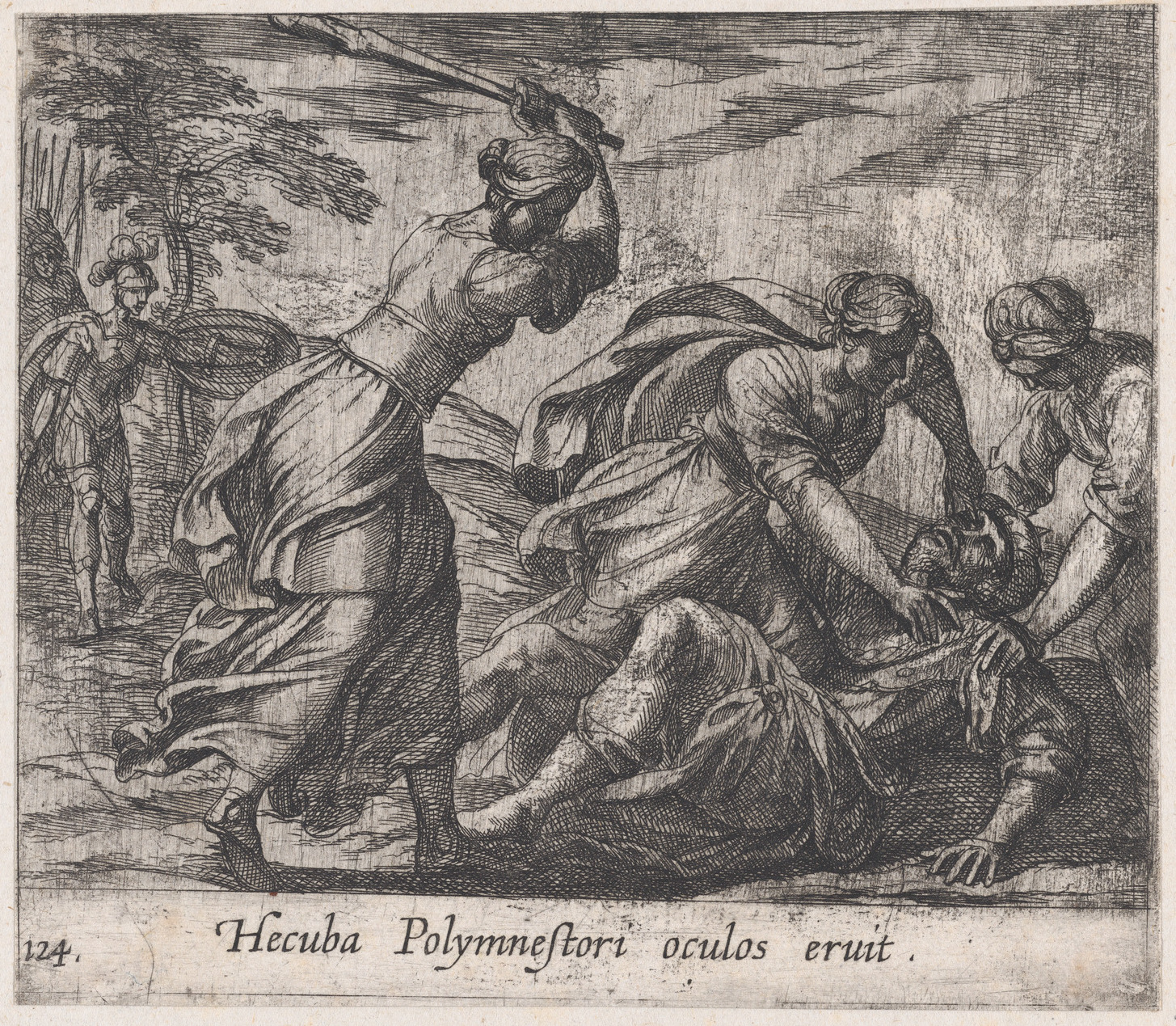
Hecuba and the Trojan Women Murdering Polymestor by Antonio Tempesta

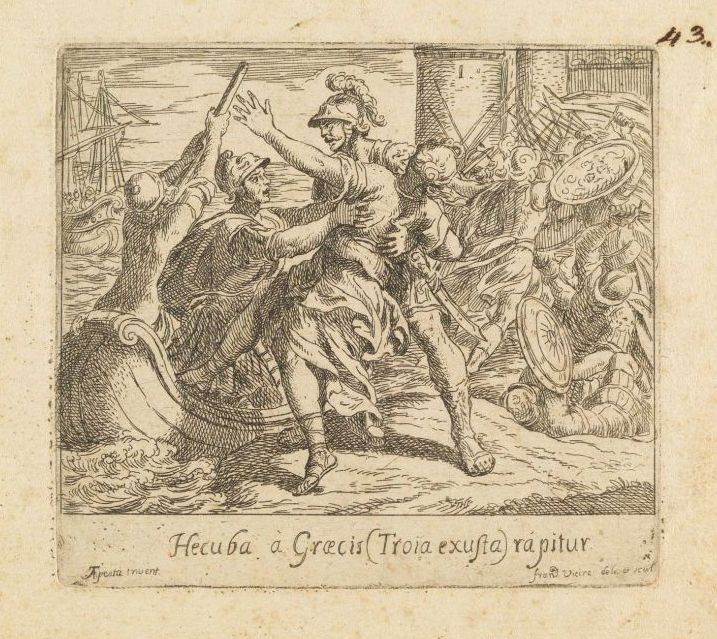
Hecuba a Graecis by Vieira Lusitano

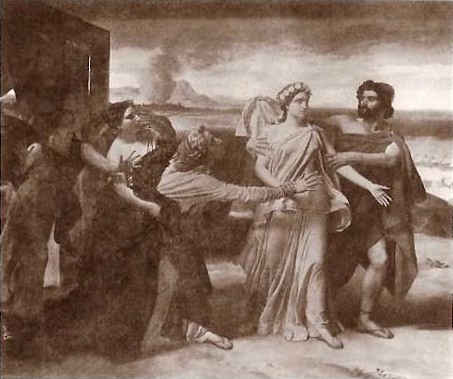
Farewell of Hecuba and Polyxena by Michel Martin Drolling (1824)

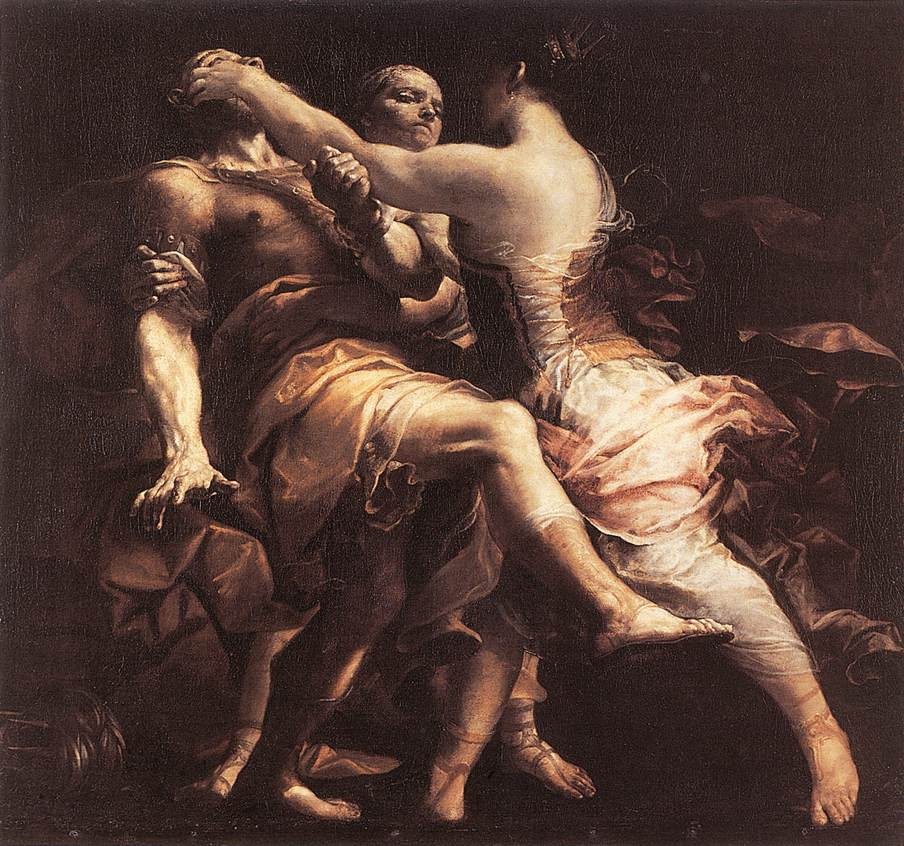
Hecuba Blinds Polymnestor by Giuseppe Maria Crespi

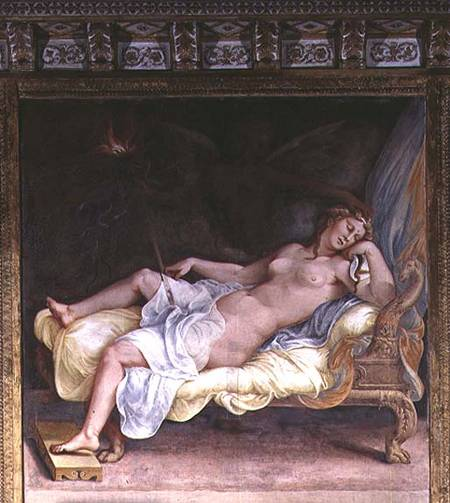
Dream of Hecuba by Giulio Romano

== In popular culture ==
Hecuba is frequently referenced in classical literature, and in many medieval, Renaissance and modern works. Among the works that feature Hecuba are:

- Hecuba, The Trojan Women, and Alexander, plays by Euripides
- Troades, tragedy by Seneca.
- The Trojan War Will Not Take Place (La Guerre de Troie n’aura pas lieu), play by Jean Giraudoux
- King Priam (1962), opera by Michael Tippett
- Cortege of Eagles (1967), ballet by Martha Graham
- Troy: Fall of a City (2018) a miniseries in which Hecuba is portrayed by Frances O'Connor

Hecuba is also referenced in Hamlet, a play by William Shakespeare. In Act 2, scene 2, the character Hamlet marvels at the skill of an actor he has just watched perform a monologue about Hecuba witnessing Priam's death with convincing grief: "What's Hecuba to him, or he to Hecuba, / That he should weep for her?" Hamlet criticizes himself for grieving his father less authentically than the actor does on behalf of the imaginary Hecuba and Priam.
