= Kilidülbahir =

- Village
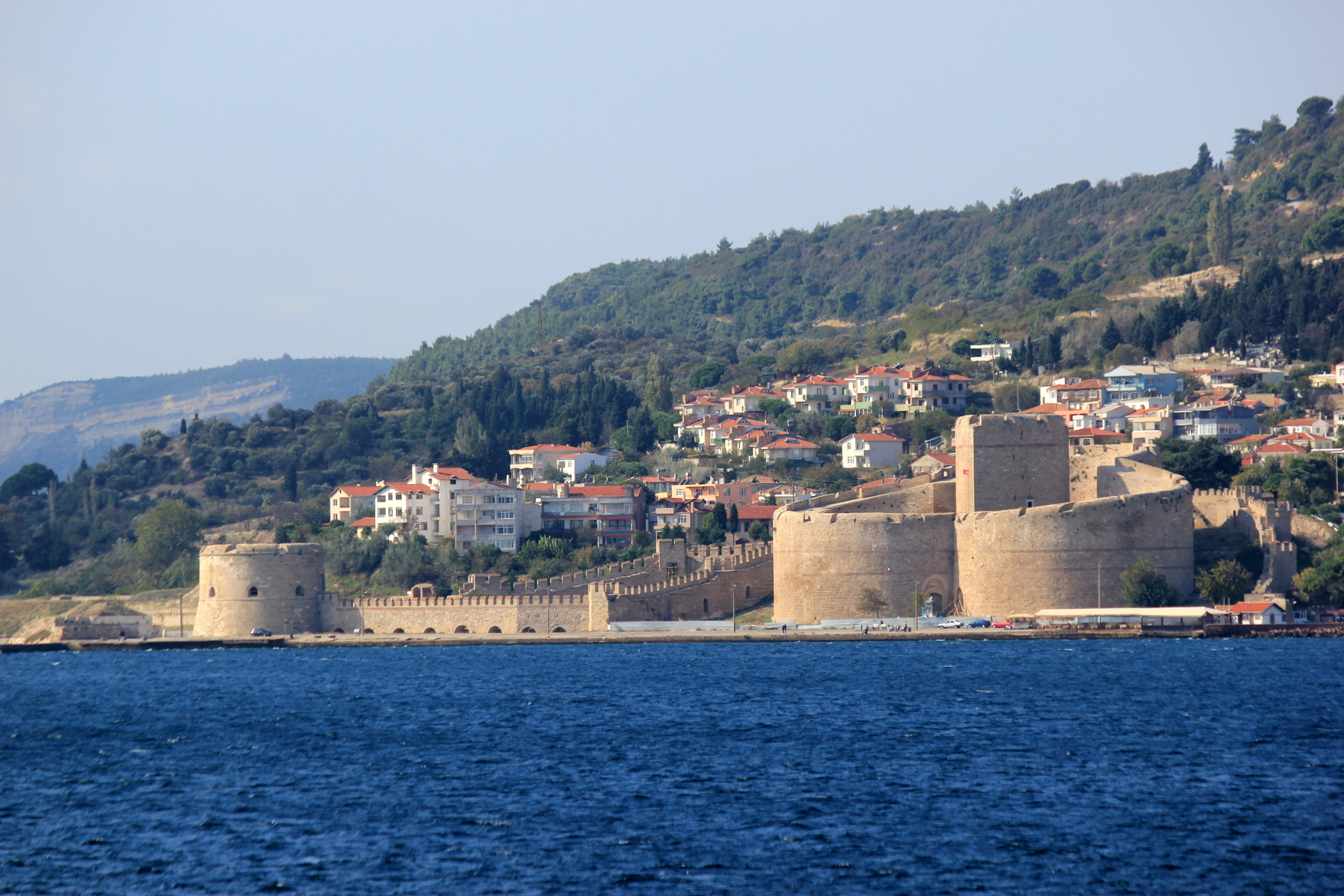
- Kilitbahir Castle, built by Mehmed II Fatih in 1452

- Location within Turkey Location within Marmara
- Coordinates: 40°08′55″N 26°22′45″E
- Country: Turkey
- Province: Çanakkale
- District: Eceabat
- Population (2021): 598
- Time zone: UTC+3 (TRT)
- Area code: 0286

Kilidülbahir (Turkish for "the key of the sea") is an ancient name for a Turkish village in the Eceabat District of Çanakkale Province, on the peninsula of Gallipoli (northwestern side of the Dardanelles). The name of the village is given as Kilidülbahir in the records of 1525 and Kilid-i Bahreyn in the records of 1665. Its name nowadays is Kilitbahir. Its population is 598 (2021).

The ancient Cynossema (Ancient Greek: Κυνὸς σῆμα or Κυνόσσημα) was near there, and the naval Battle of Cynossema took place in 411 BC between the Athenian and the Spartan fleets during the Peloponnesian War. In legend, Cynossema is also known for being the burial place of Hecuba, who threw herself into the sea and was turned into a dog.

The fort of Kilitbahir, in the form of a clover, was built by sultan Mehmed II.

== See also ==
- Gallipoli Campaign
