= Polymestor =

Mythical king of the Bistonians in Thrace

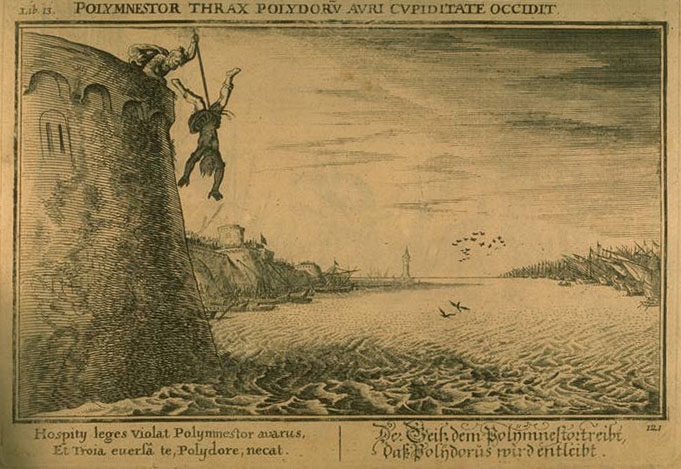
Polymnestor kills Polydorus. Engraving by Bauer for Ovid's Metamorphoses

In Greek mythology, Polymestor or Polymnestor (Ancient Greek: Πολυμ(ν)ήστωρ) was a king of the Bistonians in Thrace. Polymestor appears in Euripides' play Hecuba and in the Ovidian myth "Hecuba, Polyxena and Polydorus". Polymestor was also the name of a Greek king of Arcadia.

== Family ==
Polymestor was the husband of Ilione, the eldest daughter of King Priam and Queen Hecuba of Troy. The couple had only one son, Deipylus.

== Mythology ==
During the Trojan War, King Priam was frightened for his youngest son Polydorus's safety since Polydorus could not fight for himself. Priam sent the child, along with gifts of jewelry and gold, to the court of King Polymestor to keep him away from the fighting. After Troy fell, Polymestor betrayed Priam and threw Polydorus into the ocean in order to keep the treasures for himself.

Hecuba, Polydorus' mother, found the body and discovered the treachery. She asked Agamemnon to bring Polymestor to her. Agamemnon complied, motivated by his love of Cassandra, another of Hecuba's children. Hecuba baits Polymestor by drawing him in with treasure. Hecuba has the other Trojan women kill Polymestor's sons, and blinds Polymestor by scratching his eyes out. Polymestor is humiliated at having been blinded and made childless at the hands of slave women. Polymestor is given a trial against Hecuba by Agamemnon. Polymestor claims to have been working in the Greeks' interest by killing Polydorus before he could avenge his brothers and father. Hecuba refutes this claim by stating that the Greeks have no interest in allying with barbarians. Agamemnon sides with Hecuba and declares Polymestor's actions to be murder. Agamemnon has his soldiers seize Polymestor. As he is being taken away, Polymestor prophesies the deaths of Cassandra, the daughter of Hecuba, and Agamemnon.
