= Folake Onayemi =

Nigerian classicist (1964–2024)

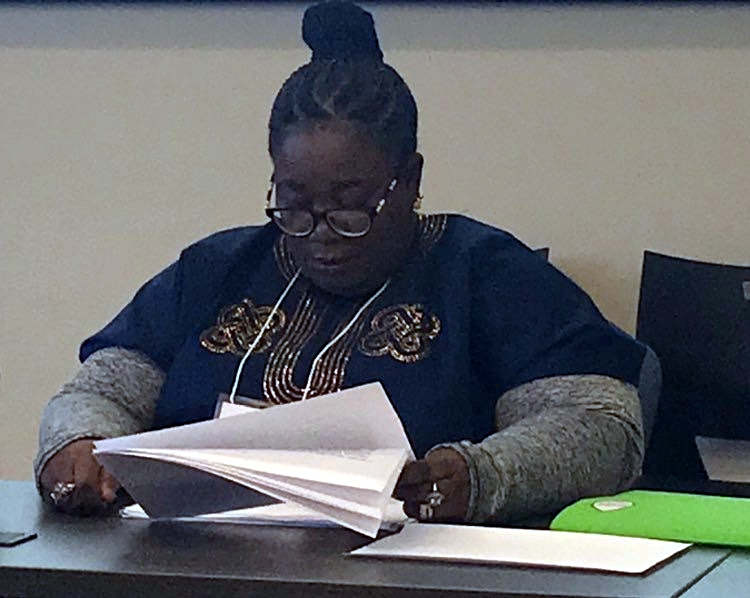
- Born: 4 October 1964; Ijebu-Jesa, Nigeria
- Died: 14 February 2024 (aged 59)
- Title: Professor of Classics

Academic background
- Education: University of Ibadan (BA, MA, MPhil, PhD)
- Thesis: Fear of Women's Beauty in Classical and African/Yoruba Literature (2001)

Academic work
- Discipline: Classicist
- Sub-discipline: Comparative Greco-Roman and West African studies
- Institutions: University of Ibadan

Folake Oritsegbubemi Onayemi (4 October 1964 – 14 February 2024) was a Nigerian literary scholar. She was Professor of Classics and served as Head of the Department of Classics at the University of Ibadan in Nigeria. She was the first woman to be awarded a PhD in Classics in Nigeria and the first black woman to become a Professor of Classics in sub-Saharan Africa. She was an expert on comparative Greco-Roman and Nigerian literature, cultures, and mythology, particularly relating to the roles and representations of women.

== Education ==
Folake Onayemi was born on 4 October 1964, in Ijebu-Jesa, Nigeria. She attended the University of Ibadan for her BA in Classics (1986), followed by an MA (1990), MPhil (1997), and PhD (2001); she was the first woman to be awarded a PhD in Classics in Nigeria, with a thesis entitled Fear of Women's Beauty in Classical and African/Yoruba Literature. During her PhD, she spent time as a visiting scholar at Brown University, Rhode Island.

== Career ==
Onayemi was appointed an Assistant Lecturer in the Department of Classics of the University of Ibadan in 1994, becoming the first woman to hold this position in the Department, and was successively promoted through the two grades of Lecturer (Lecturer II in 1996, Lecturer I in 1999), to Senior Lecturer in 2002, and Reader in 2005; in 2008, her promotion to Professor made her the first woman Professor of Classics in the University of Ibadan and the first black woman to be Professor of Classics in Sub-Saharan Africa. Her inaugural lecture, delivered on 23 June 2016, was entitled "Paradigms of Life from Ancient Greek Literature", and explored the continuing relevance of works by Homer, Sophocles, and Plutarch to life in contemporary Nigeria.

Onayemi was also a visiting professor at the Department of Classics, University of Texas at Austin, (2001); visiting scholar in the Department of Classics, University of Ghana (2009-2010, 2013–14); held a Nigerian Academy of Letters Bayo Kuku Postdoctoral Fellowship (2004), a John D. and Catherine T. MacArthur Foundation Fellowship (2005), and an Alexander S. Onassis Foundation Fellowship (2006–07). She was an advisor to the American Council of Learned Societies’ Humanities Programme, and the Nigerian Representative at the International Federation of the Societies of Classical Studies (FIEC); she also edited the departmental journal Nigeria and the Classics. She was also the author, with Kofi Ackah, of A Guide to Ancient Greek Literary History (2011), a textbook intended to introduce African students of Classics to a wide range of ancient Greek literary texts and their historical contexts.

Onayemi appeared on an episode of the BBC World Service's 'The Forum', entitled 'The Iliad: Beauty, Brutes and Battles', discussing the Iliad's origins, themes, and continuing relevance to people across the world, on 7 December 2016; the programme was presented by Bettany Hughes, and the other participants included Edith Hall. In March 2019, she delivered a keynote lecture entitled 'Yoruba Adaptations of Classical Literature' at an international conference on 'Classical Antiquity and Local Identities: from Newfoundland to Nigeria and Ghana', held at Memorial University. Onayemi also delivered a keynote lecture at the 'Global Classics and Africa: Past, Present, and Future' conference at the University of Ghana, Legon, in October 2020. As of 2022 she was the editor of the journal Nigeria and the Classics.

Onayemi died on 14 February 2024, at the age of 59. No cause of death was given.

== Reception ==
Onayemi's research was chiefly in the field of comparative studies of Greco-Roman and Nigerian or African literature and culture, a field to which she and her colleagues at Ibadan, including Olakunbi Olasope, made a highly significant contribution. Her work has been described by scholar Jo-Marie Claassen as "a uniquely African view of Antiquity". As a feminist scholar, she resisted the reduction of women to the form of a "vessel" – a common portrayal in both European and African myths; she also emphasised the plurality of women's experiences.

== Selected works ==
Of particular interest to Onayemi were the roles of women and their representation in literature and drama, topics on which she published two books and numerous articles, in addition to publishing comparative studies of Greek and Yoruba religion, and articles on the role of Classics as a discipline in contemporary Nigerian and African culture and society.

=== Books ===
- Onayemi, Folake (1999), Portraits of Women in Roman and Nigerian Drama . Oputoru Books.
- Onayemi, Folake (2004), Nature and Language of Love in Roman and African/Yoruba Literature. Hope Library of Liberal Arts No 4. Ibadan: Hope Publications.
- Onayemi, Folake (2004), Ethnic Identity, the Concept of Female Beauty and conflict in Classical and African Cultures' Programme on Ethnic and Federal Studies (PEFS) Monograph New Servers No. 12.

=== Articles and book chapters ===
- Onayemi, Folake (1998), The Medea Complex in Fagunwa's Yoruba Novel in Egbe Ifie and Dapo Adelugba (eds.) African Culture and Mythology, Ibadan: End-Time Publishing House, pp. 188 – 205.
- Onayemi, Folake (1999), The Other Woman in Classical and Yoruba Societies in Egbe Ifie (ed.) Coping with Culture, Ibadan: Opotoru Books, pp. 46 – 54.
- Onayemi, Folake (2002), Who Sacrifices - An Explanation to the Greek Question from a Yoruba Point of view, Storiae Letteratura 210, Roma. pp. 639–648.
- Onayemi, Folake (2002), Classics in Nigeria, Daedalus: University of South Africa Classical Journal. Vol. 3 No. 2.
- Onayemi, Folake (2002), Women and The Irrational in Ancient Greek and Yoruba Mythology, Ibadan Journal of Humanistic Studies No. 11 & 12 pp. 79–89.
- Onayemi, Folake (2002), Women Against Women: The Mother-in-law and Daughter- in-law Relationship in Classical and African Literature in Egbe Ifie (ed.) Papers in Honour of Tekena N. Tamuno Professor Emeritus at 70. Ibadan: Opoturu Books, pp. 138 – 148.
- Onayemi, Folake (2002), Image of Women in Classical and African Proverbs and Popular Sayings, Journal of Cultural Studies Vol. 6 No. 1 pp. 114 – 133.
- Onayemi, Folake (2002), Courageous Women in Greek and Nigerian Drama, Antigone and Tegonni, Ibadan Journal of European Studies. No. 3 pp. 153 – 161.
- Onayemi, Folake (2002), Women, Sex and Power in Classical and Nigerian Drama: Lysistrata and Morountodun in Akintunde and Labeodan (eds), Women and Culture of Violence in Traditional Africa, Ibadan: Sefer Books, pp. 41 – 51.
- Onayemi, Folake (2003), Threptia and Sanjo: The Pay Back: Parent-Child Relationship in Ancient Greek and African Yoruba Cultures, Daedalus: University of South Africa Classical Journal. Vol. 4 No. 1.
- Onayemi, Folake (2004), Finding A Place: Women's Struggle for Political Authority in Ancient Roman and Nigerian Societies, Women's History Review U.K.
- Onayemi, Folake (2005), Representation of Women's Leadership in Ancient Greek and Modern Yoruba Drama: Assembly Women and Lagidigba. In Akintunde (ed.) Women Leadership: The Nigerian Context. Ibadan: Sefer Books.
- Onayemi, Folake (2006), Sin, Punishment And Forgiveness In Ancient Greek Religion: A Yoruba Assessment, Journal of Philosophy and Culture Vol. 3 (1) 2006: pp. 72–101.
- Onayemi, Folake & Nigel Henry (2007), New Approaches to the Humanities: the Key Role of Classics, in Sola Akirinade (ed.), Rethinking the Humanities in Africa (Faculty of Arts, Obafemi Awolowo University), pp. 241–250.
