= The Trojan Women =

Ancient Greek tragedy by Euripides

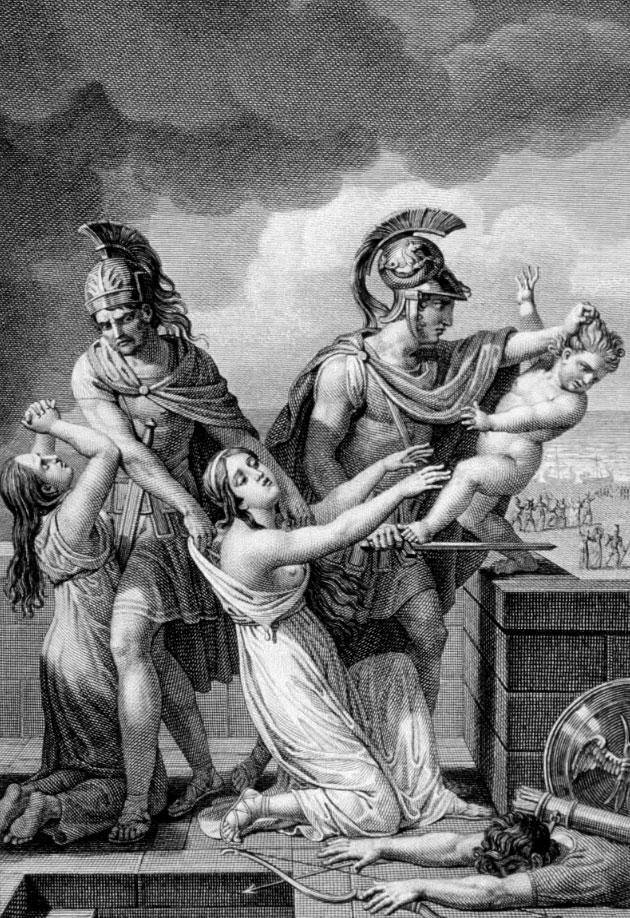
- An engraving of the death of Astyanax
- Original language: Ancient Greek
- Written by: Euripides
- Chorus: Trojan women
- Characters: Hecuba; Cassandra; Andromache; Talthybius; Menelaus; Helen; Poseidon; Athena
- Genre: Tragedy
- Setting: Near the walls of Troy

Premiere
- Place: Athens

The Trojan Women (Ancient Greek: Τρῳάδες, romanized: Trōiades, lit. "The Female Trojans") is a tragedy by the Greek playwright Euripides, produced in 415 BCE. Also translated as The Women of Troy, or as its transliterated Greek title Troades, The Trojan Women presents commentary on the costs of war through the lens of women and children. The four central women of the play are the same that appear in the final book of the Iliad, lamenting over the corpse of Hector after the Trojan War.

Hecuba, another tragedy by Euripides, similarly deals with the experiences of women left behind by war and was more popular in antiquity.

The tragedy has inspired many modern adaptation across film, literature, and the stage.

== Historical background ==
Scholar Neil Croally believes that The Trojan Women was written as a reaction to the Siege of Melos in 416 BCE during the Peloponnesian War, in which Athens invaded the Aegean island of Melos, destroyed its city, and slaughtered and enslaved its populace (see History of Milos). However, historian Mark Ringer regards this as unlikely, as Euripides was probably developing his play before the siege of Melos even began, with only a month or two after its fall to make revision, and such commentary could have offended Athenian audiences of the production. Lazenby, J. F. believes the play was also possibly written during the Peace of Nicias 421–415 BCE, a temporary peace agreement between Athens and Sparta that had brought an interruption to the major hostilities of the Peloponnesian War. Despite the agreement, tensions between the Greek city-states continued, and Athens remained involved in military and diplomatic conflicts. Later in 415 BCE, Athens launched its Sicilian Expedition against Syracuse, marking another major military campaign during the war.

It is the third play in a tetralogy by Euripides, all drawn from the same source material: the Iliad. The other works in the tetralogy include the tragedies Alexandros and Palamedes, and the comedic satyr play Sisyphus, all of which are largely lost, and only fragments survive. The Trojan Women was performed for the first time in 415 BCE as part of this tetralogy at the City Dionysia festival in Athens. Euripides won second place, losing to the obscure tragedian Xenocles.

== Plot ==
Euripides's play follows the fates of the women of Troy after their city has been sacked, their husbands killed, and their remaining families taken away as slaves. However, it begins first with the gods Athena and Poseidon discussing ways to punish the Greek armies because they condoned the rape of Cassandra, the eldest daughter of King Priam and Queen Hecuba and priestess of Apollo, by Ajax the Lesser after dragging her from a statue of Athena. What follows shows how much the Trojan women have suffered as their grief is compounded when the Greeks dole out additional deaths and divide their shares of women. The Greek herald Talthybius arrives to tell the dethroned queen Hecuba what will befall her and her children: Hecuba will be taken away to the Greek king Odysseus; the widowed princess Andromache's lot is to be the concubine of Neoptolemus, the son of the slain Greek warrior Achilles; and Cassandra is destined to become the conquering king Agamemnon's concubine.

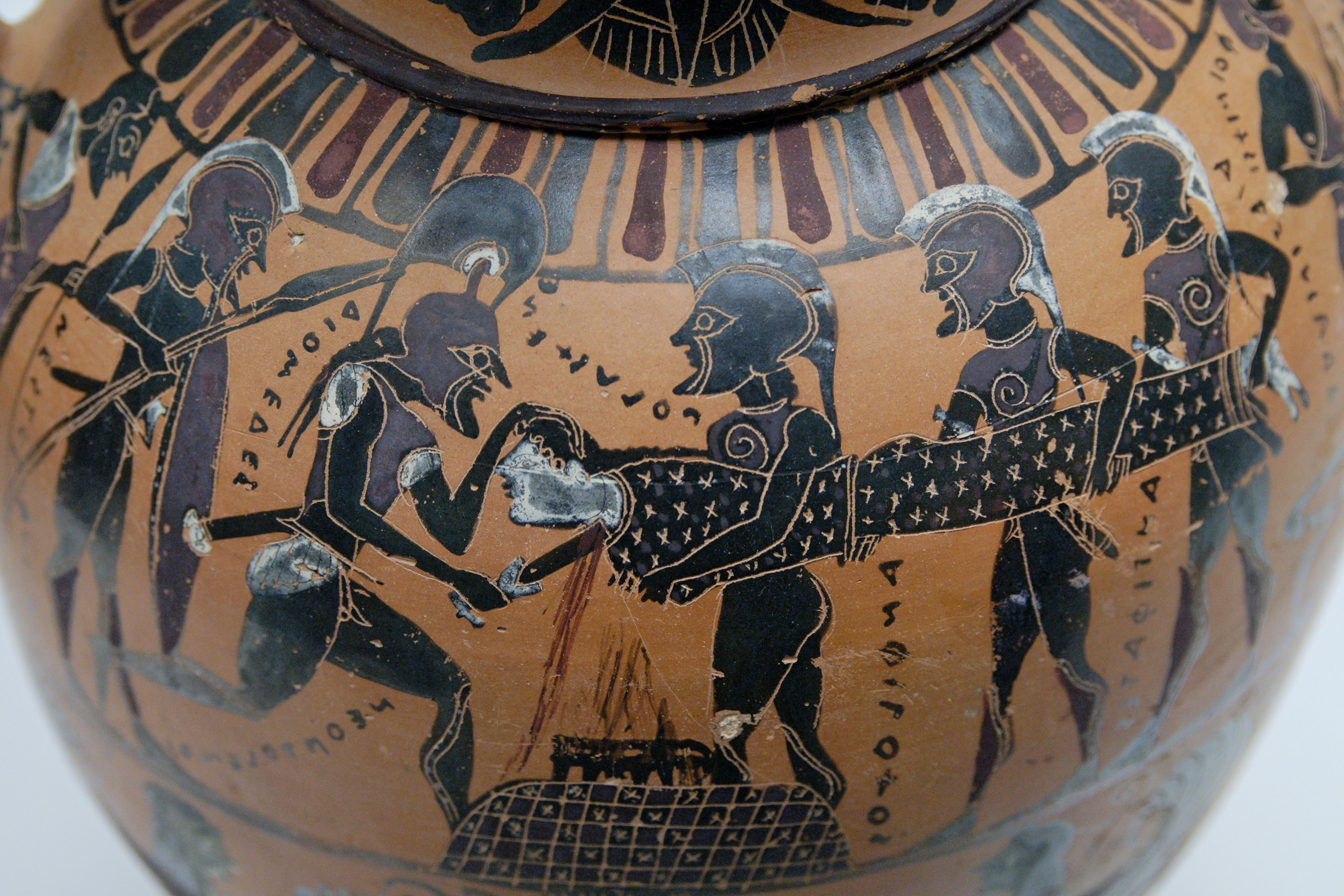
Sacrifice of Polyxena by the Greeks on an Attic black-figure Tyrrhenian amphora

Cassandra, who can see the future but is also cursed so that her visions of the future are never believed, is morbidly delighted by this news: she foresees that when they arrive in Argos, her new master's embittered wife Clytemnestra will kill both her new master and her before being killed herself by her own children. She sings a wedding song for herself and Agamemnon that describes their bloody deaths, and is taken away.

Andromache arrives, and Hecuba learns from her that her youngest daughter Polyxena has been killed as a sacrifice at the tomb of Achilles. But more horrible news for the royal family is yet to come. Talthybius reluctantly informs Andromache that her baby son Astyanax has been condemned to die: the Greek leaders are afraid that the boy will grow up to avenge his father Hector, and so rather than take this chance they plan to throw him off from the battlements of Troy to his death.

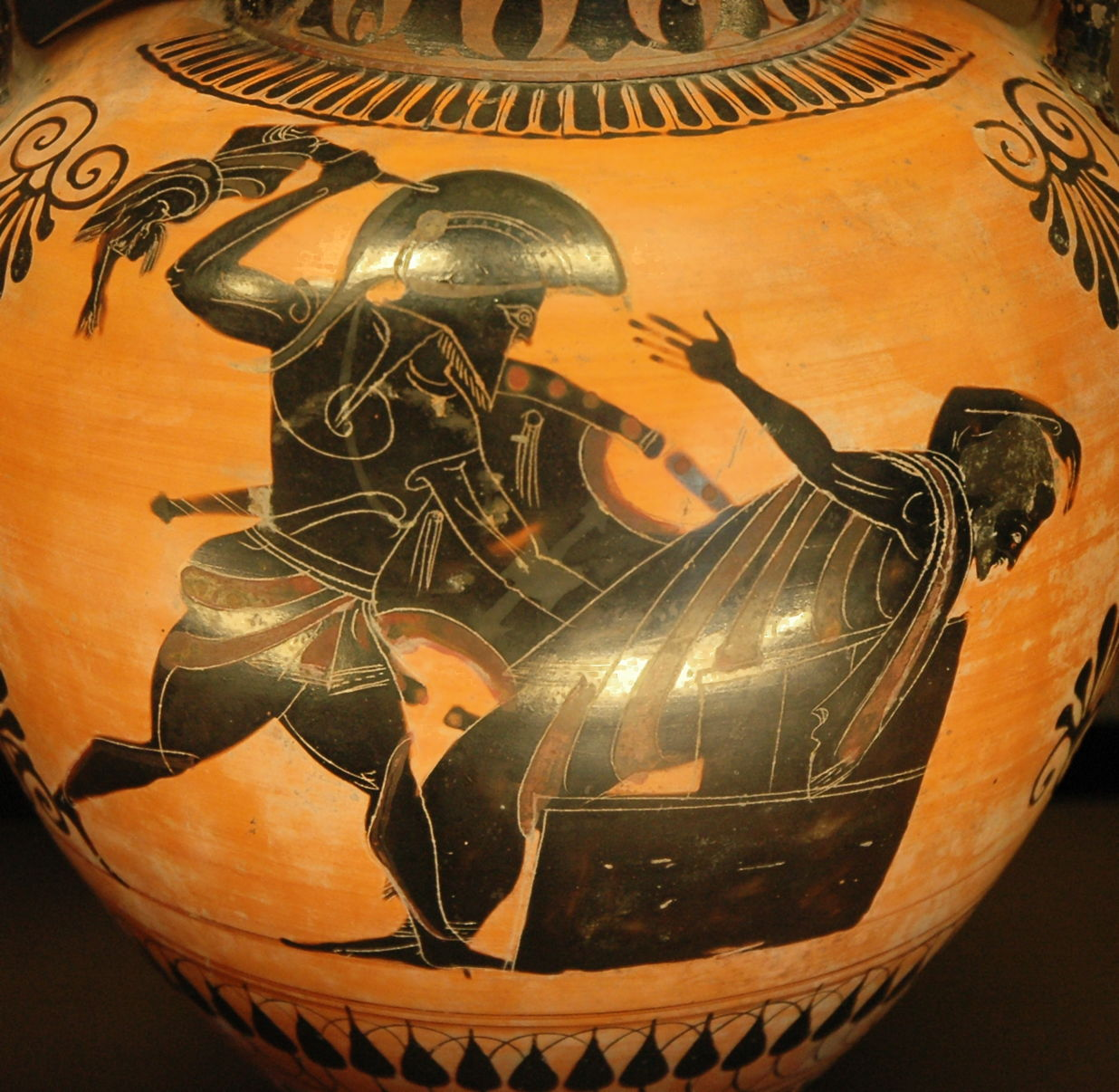
Neoptolemus killing Priam and Astyanax

Helen is supposed to suffer greatly as well: Menelaus arrives to take her back to Greece with him where a death sentence awaits her. Helen tries to convince Menelaus that Aphrodite was the cause of her betrayal and that she should not be punished, but Hecuba counters that Helen is lying and has only ever been loyal to herself. While he remains resolved that he will slay her when they return to Greece, at the end of the play it is revealed that she is still alive; moreover, the audience knows from Telemachus' visit to Sparta in Homer's Odyssey that Menelaus continued to live with Helen as his wife after the Trojan War.

In the end, Talthybius returns, carrying with him the body of Astyanax on Hector's shield. Andromache's wish had been to bury her child herself, performing the proper rituals according to Trojan ways, but her ship had already departed. Talthybius gives the corpse to Hecuba, who prepares the body of her grandson for burial before they are finally taken off with Odysseus.

Throughout the play, many of the Trojan women lament the loss of the land that reared them. Hecuba in particular lets it be known that Troy had been her home for her entire life, only to see herself as an old grandmother watching the burning of Troy, the death of her husband, her children, and her grandchildren before she will be taken as a slave to Odysseus.

== Themes and significance ==
Hecuba: O my dear child, it is not the same to be alive and dead. The one is nothing but in the other there is hope.
Andromache: Mother, listen to my argument, a powerful one, that I offer as a comfort to your heart. I say that never to have been is the same as death, but to die is better than to live in grief.

The Trojan Women presents an anti-war narrative as it highlights the postwar experiences of the women left behind after the Trojan War. The women of Troy experience grief and suffering over the loss of their husbands and children. The tragedy also calls attention to how women were treated as commodities in antiquity by showing how they were divided among the remaining men as spoils of war. The character of Cassandra demonstrates how women were not listened to or taken seriously, but rather, seen as hysterical and irrational. The tragedy considers how the treatment of women during warfare reflects broader social structures in which women's bodies and sexuality are subject to male authority. The Trojan Women, particularly Cassandra and Andromache, who are assigned to Greek victors following Troy's defeat. Their experiences illustrate how the consequences of the military conquests go further to include the captivity and sexual exploitation of its surviving women.

Through characters such as Hecuba, Andromache, and Cassandra, Euripides presents different consequences of conquest, including the loss of family, forced separation, captivity, and the loss of personal freedom. The women's experiences shift the focus away from the achievements of the Greek army and toward the lives of those who suffer as a result of its victory. The dialogue between Hecuba and Andromache further emphasizes the different responses to suffering and the loss of hope. Hecuba suggests that remaining alive offers the possibility of hope, while Andromache argues that a life defined by grief may be worse than death. Their exchange reflects the emotional consequences of war and the uncertainty faced by those who survive it. Rather than focusing on military victory, the play gives attention to the suffering of the defeated population, particularly women who have little control over their futures.

Euripides' commentary on the human costs of warfare has contributed to the play's continued significance. Its themes of displacement, enslavement, gender-based violence, and the suffering of civilians have remained relevant in later interpretations of the work. Euripides' social commentary on the costs of war The Trojan Women has left a lasting legacy. Many of its themes still resonate with the public, inspiring modern adaptations.

== Modern treatments and adaptations ==
=== Radio ===
An adaptation of the play was broadcast on the Blue Network series Great Plays on October 16, 1938, with Blanche Yurka and Selena Royle.

The Columbia Workshop broadcast an adaptation of the play by John Houseman based on the Edith Hamilton translation on December 8, 1940, on the Columbia Broadcasting System.

On 21 May 2023, BBC Radio 3 broadcast The Women of Troy, a "contemporary set re-imagining" of Euripides' play by Linda Marshall Griffiths directed by Nadia Molinari, with Maxine Peake as Hecuba, Sade Malone as Cassandra, Anneika Rose as Andromache and Ntombizodwa Ndlovu as Helen. In this version, "the chorus of women are led by a female journalist Sappho (played by Christine Bottomley) and the other voices are those of the women all over the city who are recording and broadcasting their testimonies on social media so that the world can witness what is happening to them."

=== Film ===
The Mexican film Las Troyanas (1963) directed by Sergio Véjar, adapted by writer Miguel Angel Garibay and Véjar, is faithful to the Greek text and setting.

Cypriot-Greek director Michael Cacoyannis used Euripides' play (in the famous Edith Hamilton translation) as the basis for his 1971 film The Trojan Women. The movie starred American actress Katharine Hepburn as Hecuba, British actors Vanessa Redgrave as Andromache and Brian Blessed as Talthybius, French-Canadian actress Geneviève Bujold as Cassandra, Greek actress Irene Papas as Helen, and Northern Ireland-born Patrick Magee as Menelaus.

=== Novel ===
Sheri Tepper wove The Trojan Women into her 1988 feminist science fiction novel The Gate to Women's Country.

Natalie Haynes’s novel A Thousand Ships draws on The Trojan Women, with several chapters written from their perspective

=== Stage ===
A 1905 stage version, translated by Gilbert Murray, starred Gertrude Kingston as Helen and Ada Ferrar as Athena at the Royal Court Theatre in London.

The French public intellectual Jean-Paul Sartre wrote a version of The Trojan Women (Les Troyennes) in 1965.

Israeli playwright Hanoch Levin (1943–1999) wrote his own version of the play, The Lost Women of Troy, adding more disturbing scenes and scatological details.

In 1974, Ellen Stewart, founder of La MaMa Experimental Theatre Club in New York City, presented The Trojan Women as the last fragment of a trilogy (which included Medea and Electra). With staging by Romanian-born theatre director Andrei Serban and music by American composer Elizabeth Swados, this production went on to tour more than 30 countries over the course of 40 years. Since 2014, The Trojan Women Project has been sharing this production with diverse communities that include Guatemala, Cambodia and Kosovo.

Charles L. Mee adapted The Trojan Women in 1994 to have a more modern, updated outlook on war. He included original interviews with Holocaust and Hiroshima survivors. His play is called Trojan Women: A Love Story.

In 2000, the Oregon Shakespeare Festival produced the play in modern costumes and props, with the Greek soldiers wearing camouflage and carrying assault rifles.

David Stuttard’s 2001 adaptation, Trojan Women, written in the aftermath of the September 11 attacks, toured widely within the UK and was staged internationally. In an attempt to reposition The Trojan Women as the third play of a trilogy, Stuttard then reconstructed Euripides' lost Alexandros and Palamedes (in 2005 and 2006 respectively), to form a "Trojan Trilogy", which was performed in readings at the British Museum and Tristan Bates Theatre (2007), and Europe House (2012) in London. He also wrote a version of the satyr play Sisyphus (2008) to round off Euripides' original trilogy.

Femi Osofisan's 2004 play Women of Owu sets the story in 1821, after the conquest of the Owu kingdom by a coalition of other West African states. Although it is set in 19th century Africa, Osofisan has said that the play was also inspired by the 2003 invasion of Iraq by the U.S.-led coalition.

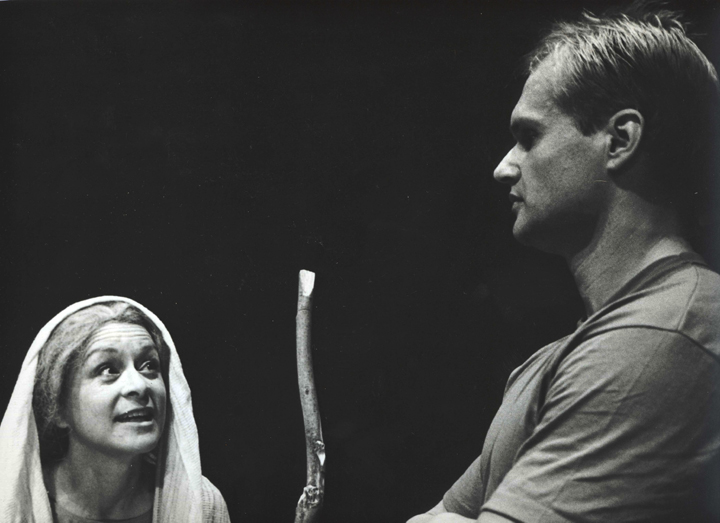
Willow Hale (Hecuba) and Sterling Wolfe (Talthybius) in The Trojan Women, directed by Brad Mays at the ARK Theatre Company (2003)

Brad Mays directed a multimedia production for the ARK Theatre Company in Los Angeles in 2003. The play opened with a faux CNN TV news report intended to echo the then-current war in Iraq. A documentary film was made of the production, released in 2004.

The Women of Troy, directed by Katie Mitchell, was performed at the National Theatre in London in 2007/08. The cast included Kate Duchêne as Hecuba, Sinead Matthews as Cassandra and Anastasia Hille as Andromache.

The Trojan Women, directed by Marti Maraden, was performed at the Stratford Festival at the Tom Patterson Theatre in Stratford, Ontario, Canada, from 14 May to 5 October 2008 with Canadian actress Martha Henry as Hecuba.

Christine Evans reworked and modernised the Trojan Women story in her 2009 play Trojan Barbie. Trojan Barbie is a postmodern updating, which blends the modern and ancient worlds, as contemporary London doll repair shop owner Lotte is pulled into a Trojan women's prison camp that is located in both ancient Troy and the modern Middle East.

In 2011, Anne Bogart's SITI Company premiered Trojan Women (After Euripides) at Getty Villa before touring the production.

In 2016, Zoe Lafferty's version of the play, Queens of Syria, in Arabic with English subtitles, was put on by the Young Vic before touring Britain.

In 2021, Anne Carson, the experimental poet, translator, and classicist, published her translation as Trojan Women: A Comic with illustrations by Rosanna Bruno, a portion of which was excerpted earlier that year in the 236th issue of the Paris Review. Carson's vision was realised by Bruno to stage the production of a tragedy in the form of a "comic," or graphic novel with the characters cast as uncanny figures, such as Hekabe as an old, once-regal dog, the goddess Athena as a pair of overalls wearing an owl mask, and the murdered baby Astyanax (last heir to the Trojan throne) as a poplar tree sapling.

Grenoble Theatre Festival poster for Mandala Theatre Company's production of Trojan Women adaptation by Karim Alrawi

In March 2023 a production of Women of Troy directed by Ben Winspear and starring his wife actor-producer Marta Dusseldorp was staged at the 10 Days on the Island festival in Tasmania, Australia. Poetry by Iranian-Kurdish refugee Behrouz Boochani, who was for many years detained by the Australian Government in Manus Island detention centre, was set to music composed by Katie Noonan and performed by a chorus of Tasmanian women and girls, interspersed with the text of the play.

In April 2026, the Oxford (UK) based Mandala Theatre Company presented Trojan Women, an adaptation by Karim Alrawi set in Gaza, directed by Yasmin Sidhwa. The production was later showcased in July of that year at the Grenoble European Theatre Festival.

=== Music Theater ===
On July 7, 1986, the opera, Troades, with a libretto by conductor Gerd Albrecht and composer Aribert Reimann based on the German translation by Franz Werfel, the author of The Song of Bernadette, opened the 1986 Munich Opera Festival. It had been commissioned by the Bavarian State Opera, which mounted the production in the National Theater Munich.

== Translations ==
Translator	Year	Style	Full text
Robert Potter	1781	Verse	
Edward Philip Coleridge	1891	Prose	full text at Wikisource
Arthur Way	1896	Verse	full text at Wikisource
Gilbert Murray	1905	Verse	full text at Wikisource
Moses Hadas and John McLean	1936	Prose	
Edith Hamilton	1937	Verse	
Richmond Lattimore	1947	Verse	available for digital loan
Isabelle Raubitschek and Anthony E. Raubitschek	1954	Prose	
Philip Vellacott	1954	Prose and verse	
Gwendolyn MacEwen	1981	Prose	
Shirley A. Barlow	1986	Prose	
Don Taylor	1990	Prose and verse	
David Kovacs	1999	Prose	
James Morwood	2000	Prose	
Howard Rubenstein	2002	Verse	
Ellen McLaughlin	2005	Prose	
George Theodoridis	2008	Prose	
Alan Shapiro	2009	Prose	
Emily Wilson	2016	Verse	
Anne Carson	2021	Comic Book, verse	Euripides' Trojan Women: A Comic, with illustrations by Rosanna Bruno

== See also ==
- List of plays with anti-war themes

== Additional resources ==
- Mortal Women of the Trojan War, information on each of the Trojan women
- Gilman, D. C.; Peck, H. T.; Colby, F. M., eds. (1905). "Troades" . New International Encyclopedia (1st ed.). New York: Dodd, Mead.
