= Polydorus of Troy =

Mythical Trojan prince, youngest son of Priam

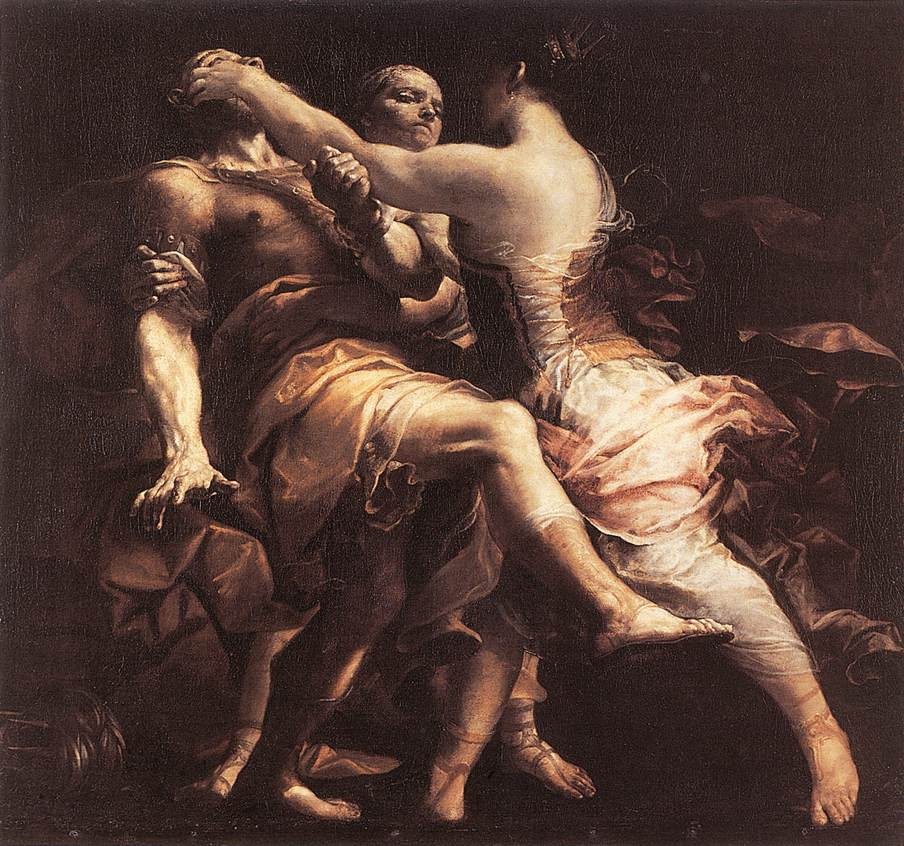
Ecuba acceca Polimestore (Hecuba blinds Polymestor), painted by Giuseppe Maria Crespi (Royal Museums of Fine Arts of Belgium)

Polydorus or Polydoros (/ˌpɒlɪˈdɔːrəs/; Ancient Greek: Πολύδωρος, i.e. "many-gift[ed]") is the youngest son of Priam in the mythology of the Trojan War. While Homer states his mother is Laothoe, later sources state his mother is Hecuba. Polydorus is an example of the fluid nature of myth, as his role and story vary significantly in different traditions and sources.

== Mythology ==
=== In the Iliad ===
In Homer's Greek epic the Iliad, Polydorus is depicted briefly as a foe to Achilles. According to this source, Polydorus was the youngest son of Priam, and thus his father would not let him fight. Achilles, however, sees him on the battlefield showing off his great speed running through the lines and spears him, ending his life. Seeing his brother Polydorus' death causes Hector to challenge Achilles.

=== In Hecuba and Metamorphoses ===
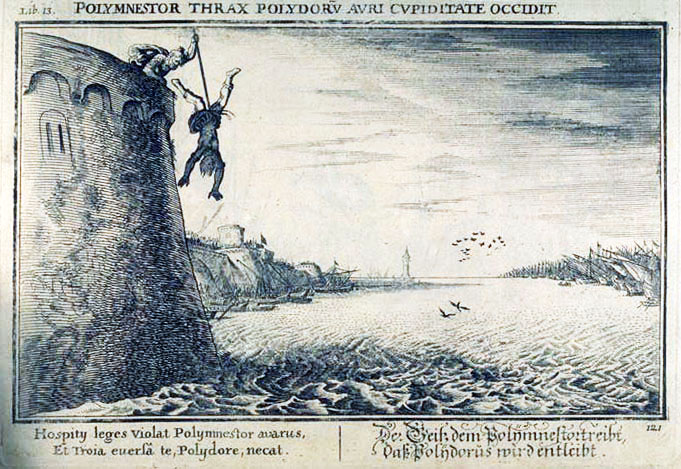
Engraving illustrating Ovid's Metamorphoses, showing Polymestor killing Polydorus

In Euripides' tragedy Hecuba, the ghost of Polydorus is a character, and his death is the cause of the main conflict of the play. Polydorus' ghost presents the prologue of the play, explaining that he was sent to Thrace under the protection of King Polymestor in case Troy fell. With his son, Priam sent gold so that if Troy should fall his son could continue to support himself. Once Troy fell, however, Polymestor killed Polydorus by throwing him into the sea and stole the gold. Polydorus laments the fact that his body is adrift in the sea without the proper death rites.

Later in the play, a slave woman tells Hecuba that Polydorus' body has been found washed up on shore. Hecuba explains that she saw the murderer of Polydorus in a dream and it is Polymestor. Aided by Agamemnon and the other captive women, Hecuba proceeds to avenge her son's murder by killing Polymestor's sons and blinding him. This same story of Polydorus is the subject of an episode in Ovid's Metamorphoses.

=== In the Aeneid ===
In Virgil's Roman epic the Aeneid, Aeneas lands in Thrace hoping to establish a colony for his people. The land is overgrown with various plants, and Aeneas begins to uproot a bush of Myrtle, which he sees growing on mysterious mound, so he can protect an altar he has just made with the boughs. The branches begin to spout blood upon being uprooted. The plant begins to speak and explains that it is Polydorus - the spears that were used to kill him stuck into the ground and took root, transforming into plants. It is explained that Priam sent Polydorus to Thrace with payment to the Thracian king so that he would be protected if Troy fell. When Troy did fall, the king broke his pact with the Trojans, killed Polydorus in order to ingratiate himself with Agamemnon and kept the payment. Aeneas goes on to give Polydorus a proper burial.

=== In Fabulae ===
According to the tradition of Hyginus' Fabulae, Priam and Hecuba entrusted Polydorus' upbringing to his sister, Iliona, who was the wife of Polymestor. In order to ensure Polydorus' safety, she raised him as her own son, while she raised her and Polymestor's true son, Deipylus, as her brother. After the fall of Troy, the Achaeans offered Polymestor Agamemnon’s daughter Electra to be his wife if he killed Polydorus. Polymestor agreed, but because of the switch that Iliona executed, he instead killed Deipylus.

As this occurred, Polydorus went to the oracle of Apollo in order to learn of his true parentage. Here he was told that his home city had been destroyed, his father killed, and his mother captured. Upon returning home, and still believing that he was the son of Polymestor and Iliona, he asked Iliona why the oracle had been wrong, at which point she tells him the truth of his ancestry. He proceeds to blind and kill Polymestor at his sister's advice.

== Namesake ==
- 4708 Polydoros, Jovian asteroid named after Polydorus

== See also ==
- List of children of Priam
- List of Metamorphoses characters
- Helen of Troy (film)
