= Evagore (mythology) =

In Greek mythology, Evagore or Evagora (Ancient Greek: Εὐαγόρη or Εὐαγόρα, romanized: Euagorê or Euagora, lit. 'the eloquent' or 'she who speaks well in the assembly') may refer to the same or two different nymphs:

- Euagore, one of the 50 Nereids, sea-nymph daughters of the 'Old Man of the Sea' Nereus and the Oceanid Doris.
- Euagora, the naiad mother of Hecabe either by King Dymas of Phrygia or the river-god Sangarius.
