= Isabelle Raubitschek =

American classical archaeologist (1914–1988)

Isabelle Kelly Raubitschek (September 2, 1914 - 1988) was an American art historian, archaeologist, and professor of art at Stanford University.

== Biography ==
Raubitschek was born in Boston, and was the oldest of three children. She began to study foreign languages as a child, eventually becoming fluent in Ancient Greek, Modern Greek, Latin, Italian, French and German. She met and studied with the art historian, Margarete Bieber, when she attended Barnard College in 1935. While at Barnard, she received the Lucille Pulitzer scholarship, which provided finances for four full years of study. She continued her graduate education at Columbia University and in 1936 went to the Institute of Art and Archaeology at Sorbonne. In 1937, she went to the American School of Classical Studies at Athens, where she studied for a year. Upon return to the United States, she taught in New York until 1940, when she became the assistant to the palaeographer, E.A. Lowe at Princeton University.

At Princeton, she met her future husband, Antony Raubitschek. Raubitschek married Antony in 1941 and the two of them were "lifelong" collaborators. She and her husband raised a family and he was a "supportive husband." Raubitschek was the chair of the archaeology department at San Francisco State University from 1963 until 1966. She joined the faculty at Stanford University in 1966. In the early 1970s, Raubitschek studied metal objects found at Isthmia; this research would be "the source for her major professional accomplishment as an archaeologist." Raubitschek worked on cataloging and discussing the thousands of metal objects from the Isthmian sanctuary, finishing her manuscript in July 1988.

Her work, published posthumously, Isthmia: Excavations by the University of Chicago Under the Auspices of the American School of Classical Studies at Athens: Vol VII, The Metal Objects (1952-1989), laid the "groundwork for all future research and publication of the metal objects from Isthmia." The American Journal of Archaeology called Isthmia VII a "critical perspective on the most important sanctuary of one of the most important gods in the ancient world."
