= Femi Osofisan =

Nigerian writer (born 1946)

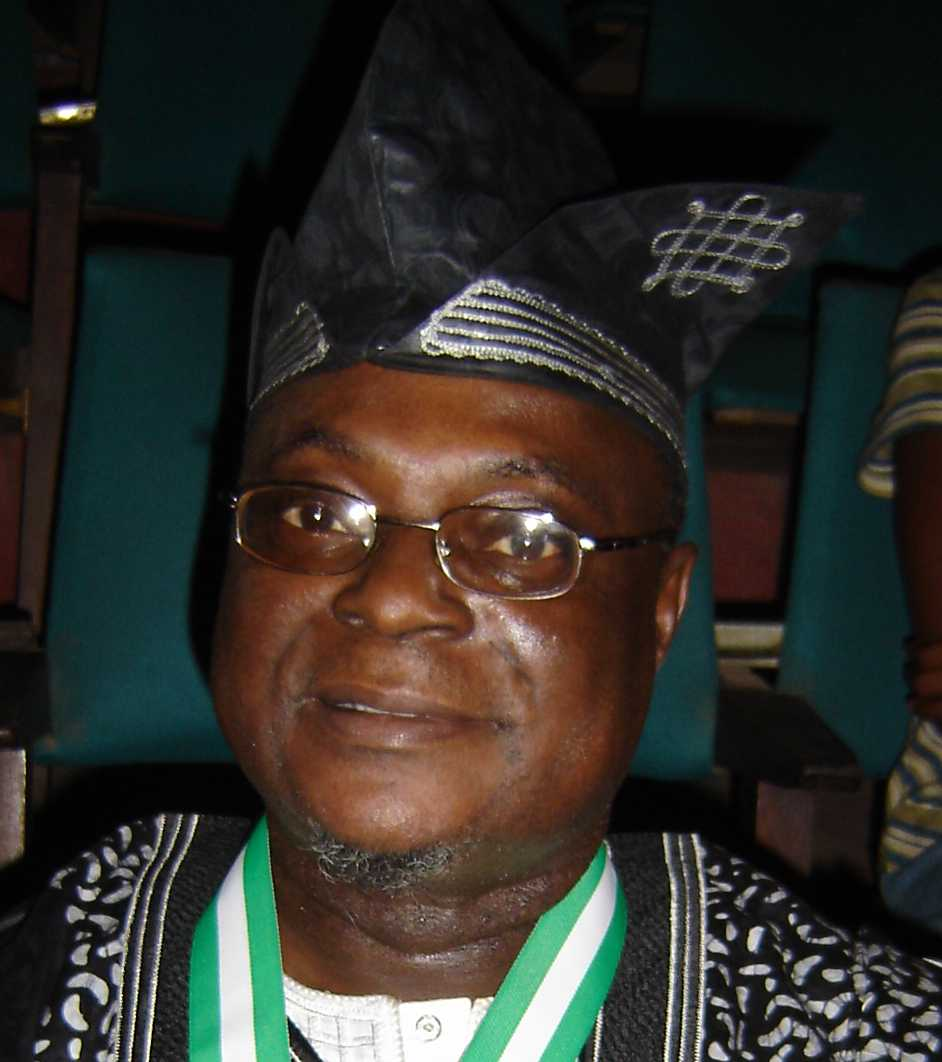
- Born: Babafemi Adeyemi Osofisan; June 16, 1946 (age 80); Erunwon, Ogun State, Nigeria
- Education: University of Ibadan; Sorbonne, Paris
- Occupations: Professor, Playwright, Poet
- Writing career
- Pen name: Okinba Launko
- Notable awards: Thalia Prize
- Website: Official website

Babafemi Adeyemi Osofisan (born June 16, 1946), known as Femi Osofisan or F.O., is a Nigerian writer and theatre critic, noted for his critique of societal problems and his use of African traditional performances and surrealism in some of his plays. A frequent theme that his drama explore is the conflict between good and evil. He is a didactic writer whose works seek to correct his decadent society. He has written poetry under the pseudonym Okinba Launko.

== Education and career ==
Babafemi Adeyemi Osofisan was born in the village of Erunwon, Ogun State, Nigeria, on June 16, 1946, to Ebenezer Olatokunbo Osofisan, a school teacher, lay reader and church organist, and Phoebe Olufunke Osofisan, a schoolteacher. His last name, Ọ̀sọ́fisan, signifies that his paternal ancestors were artists and artisans who worshipped the god of beauty and ornaments, Ọ̀ṣọ́. Osofisan attended primary school at Ife and secondary school at Government College, Ibadan. He then attended the University of Ibadan (1966–69), majoring in French and as part of his degree course studying at the University of Dakar for a year, and going on to do post-graduate studies at the Sorbonne, Paris.

Beyond playwriting, Osofisan built an academic career as a teacher, critic, and literary scholar. He taught at the University of Ibadan, where he contributed significantly to the study of theatre arts and mentored generations of students, writers, and performers.

He subsequently held faculty positions at the University of Ibadan, where he retired as full professor in 2011. He is currently a Distinguished Professor of Theatre Arts, Kwara State University, Nigeria.

His contributions to theatre extend beyond writing into directing, adaptation, translation, and performance studies, making him a prominent figure in Nigerian theatrical practice and criticism.

Osofisan is Vice President (West Africa) of the Pan African Writers' Association.

In 2016, he became the first African to be awarded the prestigious Thalia Prize by the International Association of Theatre Critics, the induction ceremony taking place on 27 September.

== Writing ==
Osofisan has written and produced more than 60 plays. He has also written four prose works: Ma'ami, Abigail, Pirates of Hurt and Cordelia, first produced in newspaper columns, in The Daily Times and then The Guardian. His prose work, Ma'ami, was adapted into a film in 2011. Several of Osofisan's plays are adaptations of works by other writers: Women of Owu from Euripides' The Trojan Women; Who's Afraid of Solarin? from Nikolai Gogol's The Government Inspector; No More the Wasted Breed from Wole Soyinka's The Strong Breed; Another Raft from J. P. Clark's The Raft; Tegonni: An African Antigone from Sophocles′ Antigone, and others.

Osofisan in his works also emphasizes gender: his representation of women as objects, objects of social division, due to shifting customs and long-lived traditions, and also as instruments for sexual exploitation; and his portrayal of women as subjects, individuals capable of cognition, endowed with consciousness and will, and capable of making decisions and effecting actions. His inspiration is based on his hometown and his society.

In 2013, drawing inspiration from Cao Yu's Thunderstorm and juxtaposing its narrative with contemporary events in his homeland, Osofisan wrote the play All for Catherine, which concerns class struggle, neocolonialism in China's activities in Africa and the anti-Chinese sentiment growing among Africans.

== Selected works ==
- Kolera Kolej. New Horn, 1975.
- The Chattering and the Song. Ibadan: Ibadan University Press, 1977.
- Morountodun and Other Plays. Lagos: Longman, 1982.
- Minted Coins (poetry), Heinemann, 1987.
- Another Raft. Lagos: Malthouse, 1988.
- Once upon Four Robbers. Ibadan: Heinemann, 1991
- Twingle-Twangle A-Twynning Tayle. Longman, 1992.
- Yungba-Yungba and the Dance Contest: A Parable for Our Times, Heinemann Educational, Nigeria, 1993.
- The Album of the Midnight Blackout, University Press, Nigeria, 1994.
- "Warriors of a Failed Utopia? West African writers since the 70s" in Leeds African Studies Bulletin 61 (1996), pp. 11–36.
- Tegonni: An African Antigone. Ibadan: Opon Ifa, 1999.
- "Theater and the Rites of 'Post-Negritude' Remembering". Research in African Literatures 30.1 (1999): 1–11.
- "Love's Unlike Lading: A Comedy from Shakespeare". Lagos: Concept Publications. 2012
- "One Legend, Many seasons". Lagos: Concept Publications. 2001
- All for Catherine, an adaptation of Thunderstorm by Cao Yu

== Themes and style ==
Femi Osofisan's dramatic works are widely noted for their engagement with political power, class struggle, and social justice. Literary scholars have described his plays as interventions in postcolonial African discourse, often using theatre as a medium for questioning systems of oppression and social inequality.

A recurring feature of Osofisan's work is his adaptation and reinterpretation of historical narratives, myths, and oral traditions, particularly those rooted in Yoruba performance culture. Rather than reproducing inherited stories unchanged, he frequently reworks them to foreground contemporary political and social concerns.

Scholars have also noted the influence of epic theatre and Brechtian dramaturgy in his plays, especially in his use of satire, audience distancing, music, and collective performance as devices for encouraging critical reflection.

== Legacy and Influence ==
Osofisan is regarded as one of the most influential dramatists in modern African literature and theatre. His body of work has attracted sustained scholarly attention in literary criticism, theatre studies, and postcolonial studies.

His plays are widely studied in universities across Africa and beyond, particularly in courses on African drama, comparative literature, and postcolonial performance. Scholars have identified his contributions as central to the development of politically engaged theatre in Nigeria.

== Awards ==
- PAWA Membership Honorary Award (2015)
- 2016: Thalia Prize from the International Association of Theatre Critics
