= Hecuba (play) =

Ancient Greek tragedy by Euripides

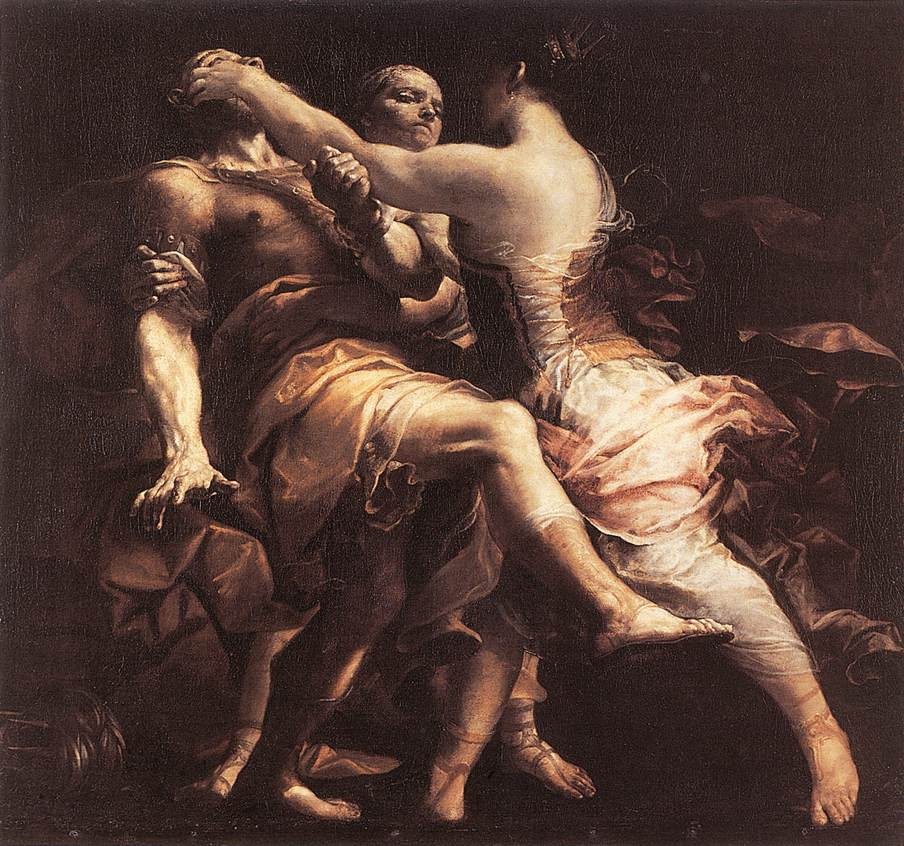
- Hecuba Blinding Polymestor by Giuseppe Crespi
- Original language: Ancient Greek
- Written by: Euripides
- Chorus: Captive Trojan Women
- Characters: Ghost of Polydorus; Hecuba; Polyxena; Odysseus; Talthybius; Maid; Agamemnon; Polymestor, and his children
- Genre: Tragedy
- Setting: Greek camp upon the shore of the Thracian Chersonese

Premiere
- Place: Athens

Hecuba (Ancient Greek: Ἑκάβη, Hekabē) is a tragedy by Euripides, written c. 424 BC. It takes place after the Trojan War but before the Greeks have departed Troy (roughly the same time as The Trojan Women, another play by Euripides). The central figure is Hecuba, wife of King Priam, formerly queen of the now-fallen city. It depicts Hecuba's grief over the death of her daughter Polyxena and the revenge she takes for the murder of her youngest son, Polydorus.

== Plot ==
In the play's opening, the ghost of Polydorus tells how when the war threatened Troy, he was sent to King Polymestor of Thrace for safekeeping, with gifts of gold and jewelry. But when Troy lost the war, Polymestor treacherously murdered Polydorus, and seized the treasure. Polydorus has foreknowledge of many of the play's events and haunted his mother's dreams the night before.

The events take place on the coast of Thrace, as the Greek navy returns home from Troy. The Trojan queen Hecuba, now enslaved by the Greeks, mourns her great losses and worries about the portents of her nightmare. The Chorus of young slave women enters, bearing fateful news. One of Hecuba's last remaining daughters, Polyxena, is to be killed on the tomb of Achilles as a blood sacrifice to his honor (reflecting the sacrifice of Iphigenia at the start of the war).

Greek commander Odysseus enters, to escort Polyxena to an altar where Neoptolemus will shed her blood. Odysseus ignores Hecuba's impassioned pleas to spare Polyxena, and Polyxena herself says she would rather die than live as a slave. In the first Choral interlude, the Chorus lament their own doomed fate, cursing the sea breeze that will carry them on ships to the foreign lands where they will live in slavery. The Greek messenger Talthybius arrives, tells a stirring account of Polyxena's strikingly heroic death, and delivers a message from Agamemnon, chief of the Greek army, to bury Polyxena. Hecuba sends a slave girl to fetch water from the sea to bathe her daughter's corpse.

After a second Choral interlude, the body of Polydorus is brought on stage, having washed up on shore. Upon recognizing her son whom she thought safe, Hecuba reaches new heights of despair.

Hecuba rages inconsolably against the brutality of such an action, and resolves to take revenge. Agamemnon enters, and Hecuba, tentatively at first and then boldly requests that Agamemnon help her avenge her son's murder. Hecuba's daughter Cassandra is a concubine of Agamemnon so the two have some relationship to protect and Agamemnon listens. Agamemnon reluctantly agrees, as the Greeks await a favorable wind to sail home. The Greek army considers Polymestor an ally and Agamemnon does not wish to be observed helping Hecuba against him.

Polymestor arrives with his sons. He inquires about Hecuba's welfare, with a pretense of friendliness. Hecuba reciprocates, concealing her knowledge of the murder of Polydorus. Hecuba tells Polymestor she knows where the remaining treasures of Troy are hidden, and offers to tell him the secrets, to be passed on to Polydorus. Polymestor listens intently.

Hecuba convinces him and his sons to enter an offstage tent where she claims to have more personal treasures. Enlisting help from other slaves, Hecuba kills Polymestor's sons and stabs Polymestor's eyes. He re-enters blinded and savage, hunting as if a beast for the women who ruined him.

Agamemnon re-enters angry with the uproar and witnesses Hecuba's revenge. Polymestor argues that Hecuba's revenge was a vile act, whereas his murder of Polydorus was intended to preserve the Greek victory and dispatch a young Trojan, a potential enemy of the Greeks. The arguments take the form of a trial, and Hecuba delivers a rebuttal exposing Polymestor's speech as sophistry. Agamemnon decides justice has been served by Hecuba's revenge. Polymestor, again in a rage, foretells the deaths of Hecuba by drowning and Agamemnon by his wife Clytemnestra, who will also kill Cassandra. Soon after, the wind finally rises again, the Greeks will sail, and the Chorus goes to an unknown, dark fate.

The plot falls into two clearly distinguished parts: the Greeks' sacrifice of Hecuba's daughter, Polyxena, to the shade of Achilles, and the vengeance of Hecuba on Polymestor, the Thracian king.

== In popular culture ==
A performance of Hecuba is a focus of the 2018 two-part comedy film A Bread Factory. The performance in this film uses the translation by Diane Arnson Svarlien.

== Translations ==
- Robert Potter, 1783 – verse: full text
- Edward P. Coleridge, 1891 – prose: full text
- Arthur S. Way, 1912 – verse: full text
- J. T. Sheppard, 1925 – verse
- William Arrowsmith, 1958 – verse: available for digital loan
- Philip Vellacott, 1963 – verse
- Timberlake Wertenbaker, 1995 – verse
- James Morwood, 1997 – prose
- Frank McGuinness, 2004 – verse
- Anne Carson, 2006 – prose
- George Theodoridis 2007 – prose: full text
- Jay Kardan and Laura-Gray Street, 2011 – verse: full text
- Brian Vinero, 2011 – verse
- Diane Arnson Svarlien, 2012 – verse
