= Abarbarea (lover of Bucolion) =

Naiad in Greek mythology

In Greek mythology, Abarbarea (Ancient Greek: Ἀβαρβαρέη, romanized: Abarbaree, lit. 'unmuddy') was a naiad. In the Iliad, she was the lover of Bucolion, by whom she became the mother of Aesepus and Pedasus.

== Family ==
Abarbarea was the lover of Bucolion (the eldest but illegitimate son of the Trojan king Laomedon) and had twin sons by him, Aesepus and Pedasus, who were killed by Euryalus during the Trojan War.

"Then Euryalus slew Dresus and Opheltius, and went on after Aesepus and Pedasus, whom on a time the fountain-nymph Abarbarea bare to peerless Bucolion. Now Bucolion was a son of lordly Laomedon, his eldest born, though the mother that bare him was unwed; he while shepherding his flocks lay with the nymph in love, and she conceived and bare twin sons."

— Homer, Iliad, 6.21–23

== Mythology ==
Before her marriage to Bucolion, Abarbarea often reproached Nicaea for having killed the mortal ox-herder Hymnus.

"The Nymph of the mountain was sore offended at manslaying Nicaia, and lamented over the body of Hymnos; in her watery hall the girl of Rhyndacos groaned, carried along barefoot by the water; the Naiads wept, and up in Sipylos, the neighbouring rock of Niobe groaned yet more with tears that flow uncalled; the youngest girl of all, still unacquainted with wedded love, not yet having come to Bucolion's pallet, the Naiad Abarbarea oft reproached the nymph..."
