= Pedasus =

Figures and places in Greek mythology and history

Pedasus (Ancient Greek: Πήδασος) has been identified with several personal and place names in Greek history and mythology.

== Persons ==
In Homer's Iliad, Pedasus was the name of a Trojan warrior, and the son of the naiad Abarbarea and human Bucolion. His twin brother was Aesepus; both were slain by Euryalus, the son of Mecisteus, during the Trojan War.

In Homer's Iliad, Pedasus was also the name of a swift horse taken as booty by Achilles when he killed Eetion. This horse was killed by a spear during a duel between Patroclus and Sarpedon.

In Ovid’s Metamorphoses, Pedasus is named as one of Phineus’s rioters at the wedding of Perseus and Andromeda. During the battle, he kills the poet Lampetides as he tries to stay out of the battle, and for that, the warrior Lycormas breaks his spine with a beam.

== Places ==
Pedasus (Caria): In Caria, according to Herodotus, the Battle of Pedasus (Summer of 496 BCE) was a night ambush where the Carians annihilated a Persian army. This engagement occurred during the Ionian Revolt (499-494 BCE).

Pedasus (Messenia): In Peloponnese, Methone has been identified with the vine-covered Pedasus, one of the seven cities offered by Agamemnon to Achilles to quell his rage and to persuade him to return to the Siege of Troy.

Pedasus (Mysia): In the Troad, there was another Pedasus on the Satnioeis river, said to be inhabited by a tribe called the Leleges. During the Trojan War, this Pedasus was ruled over by a certain king named Altes. This city was sacked by Achilles.
