= Drosera (disambiguation) =

Drosera may refer to:

- The plant genus Drosera
- Drosera (naiad), a nymph from Greek mythology.
