= Aesepus =

In Greek mythology, may refer to two individuals

In Greek mythology, Aesepus (Ancient Greek: Αἴσηπος) may refer to:

- Aesepus, one of the river-god sons of the Titans Oceanus and his sister-wife Tethys. He was the divine personification of the river and nearby town of Aesepus (today known as Gönen in Turkey). Aesepus was the grandfather of the other Aesepus through his daughter Abarbarea. His other daughter Phrygia was the eponym of the country Phrygia.
- Aesepus, the son of the naiad Abarbarea (daughter of the above Aesepus) and Bucolion. His twin brother was Pedasus; the pair appears briefly in the Iliad, Book VI. Both men fought in the Trojan War and were killed by Euryalus, the son of Mecisteus.
