= Tyrimmas =

Tyrimmas (Greek: Τυρίμμας) may refer to:

- Tyrimmas of Macedon third king after Caranus and Coenus.
- Tyrimmas, King of Dodona in Epirus. His daughter Euippe bore Odysseus a son, Euryalus, who was later mistakenly slain by his father
- Tyrimmas, father of Agathon (son of Tyrimmas), the latter a cavalry commander under Alexander the Great
