= Drosera (mythology) =

In Greek mythology, a naiad

In Greek mythology, Drosera (Ancient Greek: Δροσερή) was a naiad. She was one of the three ancestors of the Tyrians, along with Abarbarea and Callirrhoe. These nymphs were joined to sons of the soil (autochthonous) by the god Eros who was angered by their chastity.

== Mythology ==
In Nonnus' Dionysiaca. Drosera was mentioned in the following text:

There, Lord Dionysos, I have told you of the soilbred race of the Earthborn, self born, Olympian, that you might know how the Tyrian breed of your ancestors sprang out of the earth. Now I will speak of the fountains. In the olden days they were chaste maidens primeval, but hot Eros was angered against their maiden girdles, and drawing a shaft of love he spoke thus to the marriage-hating nymphs: ' Naiad Abarbarea, so fond of your maidenhood, you too receive this shaft, which all nature has felt. Here I will build Callirhoe's bridechamber, here I will sing Drosera's wedding hymn ... and from his [i.e. Eros] backbent bow let fly three shots. Then in that watery bower he joined in love sons of the soil to the Naiads, and sowed the divine race of your family.
