= Tyrimmas of Dodona =

Mythical character in Greek mythology

In Greek mythology, Tyrimmas (Ancient Greek: Τυρίμμας, romanized: Turímmas) was a King of Dodona in Epirus. His daughter Euippe bore Odysseus a son, Euryalus, who was later mistakenly slain by his father.
