= List of rape victims from ancient history and mythology =

Rape is a common topic in history and mythology. A list of notable survivors from history and mythology includes:

== Ancient history ==
- Junilla, a daughter of Sejanus, who was raped before she was executed because it was unlawful to execute a virgin.
- Lady Xi Gui 息媯 : Princess Xi Nü of Chen.She and her elder sister, Cai Nü, were respectively married off to the states of Xi and Cai. However, the ruler of Cai not only confined Cai Nü, but also imprisoned the beautiful Xi Nü, raping her and making her his concubine. The ruler of Xi appealed to King Wen of Chu, who led a great army and rescued her. Yet King Wen himself was captivated by her beauty; he destroyed the state of Xi, raped Xi Nü, and is said to have made her bear him two children. After King Wen’s death, his younger brother Ziyuan forced her to live with him, and it is thought that she was assaulted again at that time.
- Consorts of the Chen imperial harem, after the Sui dynasty conquered the Southern Chen dynasty, the army led by Han Qinhu(韩擒虎) raped them.
- Yu Wenjun, an empress who was raped by the rebel troops. And her servant girls were raped too.
- Boudica's two daughters, raped by Roman soldiers
- Rogneda of Polotsk or Gorislava; according to the Suzdalian Chronicle sub anno 1128, raped by Vladimir, half-brother of her betrothed Yaropolk I of Kiev, in the presence of her parents (10th century)
- A slave girl in Ibn Fadlan's account of a Norse funeral (c. 922), gang-raped and killed as part of a chief's funeral ritual
- Li Zu'e, an empress who was raped by her brother-in-law and became pregnant
- Artemisia Gentileschi (1593-c. 1656), Italian Baroque artist
- Xenia Borisovna, Russian princess, forcibly taken as a concubine by False Dmitry I
- Periander, tyrant of Corinth, was said to have experienced rape by deception from his mother.

== Mythology ==
=== Greek mythology ===
==== Female ====
- Alcippe a daughter of Ares; raped by Halirrhothius, the son of Poseidon. She is avenged by Ares, who kills Halirrhothius.
- Alcmene; raped by Zeus in form of her husband Amphitryon, resulting in the birth of Heracles.
- Apemosyne; raped by Hermes, after slipping on skinned hides that he placed on her path. Later killed by her angry brother who thought she was lying about being raped by the god and kicked her to death.
- Atalanta; attempted rape by the centaurs Rhoecus and Hylaios, both of whom she slew with her bow.
- Auge; raped by Heracles.
- Aura; raped by Dionysus while she was drunk.
- Callisto; raped by Zeus in the form of Artemis (or Apollo in one version), resulting in the birth of Arcas. She was then transformed into a bear by Artemis when she found out she had slept with a man. Zeus placed both Callisto and Arcas in the sky as the constellations Ursa Major and Ursa Minor.
- Cassandra; raped by Ajax the Lesser during the Sack of Troy.
- Chione; raped by Hermes in her sleep. She was later raped by Apollo that same day.
- Cassiopeia; raped by Zeus in the form of her husband Phoenix.
- Chalciope, abducted and raped by Heracles who planned an attack on Cos at night, killing her father Eurypylus, because he wanted her.
- Danae; raped by Zeus in the form of golden rain, resulting in the birth of Perseus.
- Demeter; only to a much later myth,(Arcadian myth, written around 2 AD), Demeter was being pursued by her brother Poseidon, and she changed into a horse to escape him. Poseidon, however, transformed himself into a horse and, after cornering Demeter, raped his older sister, resulting in her giving birth to Despoina, a mysterious goddess, and Arion, a divine horse.
- Dryope; raped by Apollo in the form of a snake.
- Europa; abducted by Zeus in the form of a white bull, then raped, resulting in the birth of Minos.
- Halie; a Rhodian woman raped by her own sons.
- Harpalyce; raped by her own father Clymenus.
- Hera; raped by the Giant Eurymedon raped Hera when she was young. She was also raped by her brother (and later husband) Zeus.
- Io; pursued and eventually raped by Zeus; transformed into a heifer.
- Leda, raped by Zeus in the form of a swan. This resulted in the birth of Helen of Troy and Polydeuces (Pollux).
- Liriope; raped by the river god Cephissus, resulting in the birth of Narcissus.
- Merope; raped by Orion after he got drunk.
- Metis; pursued and eventually raped by her cousin (and later husband) Zeus, resulting in the eventual birth of Athena.
- Nemesis; raped by Zeus, her first cousin once removed, who relentlessly pursued her, changing many forms. In some versions, Nemesis is the mother of Helen of Troy rather than Leda.
- Nicaea; raped by Dionysus while she was unconscious.
- Persephone; raped by her uncle Hades and in Orphic tradition by her father Zeus disguised as a snake or as Hades himself. This resulted in the birth of Zagreus and Melinoë.
- Philomela; raped by her brother-in-law Tereus.
- Procris; raped by Minos.
- Rhea; raped by her son Zeus.
- Tyro; raped by Poseidon in the form of her beloved, the river-god Enipeus.
- Upis/Opis; raped by Orion. Artemis shot him dead with her arrows when she found out.

==== Male ====
- Adonis; in some versions, raped by Aphrodite.
- Cephalus; raped by Eos
- Chrysippus of Elis; raped by King Laius of Thebes, father of Oedipus by Jocasta.
- Cinyras; raped by his daughter, Myrrha, via deception and alcohol.
- Daphnis, son of Hermes; raped by Echenais or Nomia, with the aid of wine.
- Endymion; raped by Selene as he slept.
- Ganymede; raped by Zeus
- Hylas; raped by naiads.
- Lyrcus, son of Phoroneus, raped by Hemithea, by means of alcohol.
- Odysseus; in some versions, raped by Calypso on the island of Ogygia in his seven-year stay.
- Silenus; raped by the cyclops Polyphemus.

==== Attempted rape ====
- Amymone; attempted rape by a satyr. While searching for water during a drought, she was attacked by a satyr who attempted to rape her, but she was rescued by Poseidon, who chased the satyr away with his trident.
- Arethusa; attempted rape by Alpheus. She turned into a well to escape from him.
- Artemis; attempted rape by Orion, her only male hunter companion, which resulted in her killing him. Alpheus also tried to rape her but she covered her face and her nymphs' in mud so that he could not distinguish them and gave up.
- Athena; attempted rape by Hephaestus after he was convinced by Poseidon that she was madly in love with him. She fiercely fought him off, causing his semen to fall upon the earth instead, which gave birth to Erichthonius.
- Daphne; attempted rape by Apollo. Infatuated by Eros's arrow, Apollo pursued the nymph to violate her. Just as he caught up to her, she prayed to her father, the river god Peneus, and was transformed into a laurel tree to escape him.
- Dionysus; attempted rape by Tyrrhenian pirates. In some versions, the pirates were captivated by Dionysus's beautiful appearance and attempted to rape him, but failed when the god unleashed his divine powers.
- Hestia; attempted rape by Priapus while she slept, but a donkey woke her up.
- Lotis; attempted rape by Priapus. The fertility god tried to violate her while she was asleep, but she was awakened by the braying of Silenus's donkey and managed to escape him.
- Syrinx; attempted rape by Pan. The nymph fled from the pursuing god to the river Ladon, where she prayed to the water nymphs and was transformed into water reeds to escape him.

=== Hebrew Bible ===
- Dinah; raped by a Canaanite prince and avenged by her brothers.
- Lot; raped by his daughters while under effect of alcohol, Genesis 19:30-38.
- Tamar; raped by her half-brother Amnon and avenged by her brother Absalom.
- Susanna; a Hebrew wife who was privately bathing, when two men spy upon her and try to extort her into have sexual relations with them, by making false allegations against her.

=== Norse mythology ===
- Rindr; raped by Odin in Saxo Grammaticus' version of the engendering of Baldr's avenger
- Loki; ambiguous, but it's implied he was raped by Svaðilfari in Gylfaginning when disguised as a mare.

=== Roman mythology ===
- Lucretia; raped by a prince, Sextus Tarquinius.
- The Sabine women; raped by the founders of Rome
- Rhea Silvia, raped by Mars.
- Medusa; raped by Neptune in Minerva's temple, as the rape happens only in Ovid's version.
- Nyctimene; daughter of Epopeus, king of Lesbos, she was raped by her father. She was later transformed into an owl by Minerva, and chosen as her sacred animal, to save her.
- Lara; raped by Mercury as he escorted her to the Underworld.
- Caeneus; formerly known as Caenis raped by Neptune only in Ovid's version.
- Hermaphroditos; raped by (and later merged with) the nymph Salmacis. In the greek tradition, he was the son of Hermes and Aphrodite, and he was born with both male and female genitalia. His fusion with Salmacis, is a later Ovid's invention.

=== Knights of the Round Table ===
- Lancelot; Elaine of Corbenic posed as his lover Guinevere to perform a rape by deception upon him.
- Igraine; Uther Pendragon posed as her husband Duke Gorlois of Cornwall to perform a rape by deception on her, leading to the birth of King Arthur.
- King Arthur; Morgause, his half-sister, posed as his wife Guinevere, to perform a rape by deception on him, leading to the birth of Mordred.

== See also ==
- Sexual consent
