= Altes =

Lelegian king in Greek mythology

In Greek mythology, Altes was a Lelegian king who resided at Pedasus, which was situated in or near the Troad. According to Homer's Iliad, Altes was the father of Laothoe, one of the many wives of King Priam. In other accounts, Altes is also said to be the father of the Argonaut Ancaeus of Samos; perhaps because this Ancaeus was also of Lelegian stock. The parentage of Altes is not given by the ancient mythographers.
