= Nicaea (mythology) =

Ancient Greek water nymph

- huntress and naiad nymph of Astacia
- Abode: Nicaea or Lake Ascania in Bithynia

Genealogy
- Parents: Sangarius and Cybele
- Consort: Dionysus
- Children: Telete, Satyrus, other sons

In Greek mythology, Nicaea (/naɪˈsiːə/ nye-SEE-ə) or Nikaia (Ancient Greek: Νίκαια, romanized: Níkaia, pronounced [nǐːkai̯a]) is a Naiad nymph of the springs or fountain of the ancient Greek colony of Nicaea in Bithynia (in northwestern Asia Minor) or else the goddess of the adjacent lake Ascania. Nicaea and her myth are featured primarily in the Dionysiaca, a fifth-century epic poem by Nonnus, though she might have originated from local stories of Bithynia. The virginal nymph Nicaea is courted by Dionysus, although she rejects him.

== Family ==
Nicaea is the daughter of the river-god Sangarius and the mother-goddess Cybele. By the god of wine, Dionysus, she mothered Telete (consecration) and Satyrus, as well as other children.

== Mythology ==
=== Nonnus' account ===
Panoramic view of lake Ascania, now known as Lake İznik, Turkey.

Nicaea was a huntress, devoted to the goddess Artemis from Astacia, a sworn virgin unacquainted with Aphrodite, the goddess of love. Eros made a young shepherd named Hymnus ("hymn") fall in love with her with a single arrow. One day, Hymnus stole Nicaea's hunting gear, her arrows, her nets, her lance, and quiver, lamenting his misfortune. Nicaea found him, and he pressured her to shoot him in the heart, so that he might be freed from the soreness of unrequited love. Angered, Nicaea obliged and fulfilled his wish.

Hymnus was greatly mourned; Adrasteia alerted Aphrodite and Eros of Nicaea's deeds. Eros then found Dionysus, and shot him with one of his love arrows; the moment Dionysus saw Nicaea bathing not too far from where he stood, he instantly fell in love, and had nothing else in mind but her. He tried to court her, but to no avail:

I have no itch to call even your Cronion ' goodfather, seek another, Bacchos, some new bride not unwilling. Why all this haste? This race is not for you to win; so Latoides once pursued Daphne, so Hephaistos Athena. Why this haste? this race is vain; for among the rocks, buskins are far better than slippers.

— Nicaea to Dionysus.

One day Nicaea, thirsty, drunk from a sweet spring, not knowing Dionysus had previously filled it with wine, and was instantly intoxicated. Seeing double, Nicaea lay down to rest. Eros then pointed her whereabouts to Dionysus, who proceeded to rape the unconscious nymph. When she woke up and realised what had happened, she was distraught; crying, she contemplated suicide, and sought Dionysus out, wishing to harm him, but she never found him.

Nicaea conceived Telete from this union; after her daughter's birth, Nicaea attempted to hang herself. Although surviving stories do not tell if she made any further suicide attempts, she did live to see Aura, another nymph raped and impregnated by Dionysus in the same manner, going into labor and giving birth to Iacchus, as described in Nonnus’s Dionysiaca. After Dionysus raped Aura, Nicaea expressed her condolences to the unfortunate goddess, having herself suffered the same, and lamented the fact that she could no longer roam the woods with her bow and arrows due to her ill fate.

After Aura gave birth to twins, in her frenzy she killed one infant; Artemis saved the other, Iacchus, and Dionysus gave him to Nicaea to nurse.

Dionysus named the city Nicaea after her.

=== Memnon's account ===
According to Photius I of Constantinople's account, Memnon of Heraclea wrote that Nicaea was a Naiad nymph daughter of Cybele and the river god Sangarius who preferred her virginity to relationships with men. Dionysus courted her, but she kept rejecting his advances; so Dionysus replaced the water in the spring she used to drink from with wine. Nicaea, not suspecting a thing, drank from there. Thus drunkenness and sleep took over her, and Dionysus took advantage of her, against her will. By Dionysus she had Satyrus and (after reconciling with him?) other sons. The city of Nicaea, nowadays known as İznik in Turkey, was thus named after her. In other classical authors the city was actually named such by Lysimachus after his recently deceased wife Nicaea of Macedon.

== See also ==
- Greco-Roman mysteries
- Aura, another nymph raped by Dionysus in her sleep
- Nemesis
- List of rape victims from ancient history and mythology
