= Euippe (daughter of Tyrimmas) =

Daughter of Tyrimmas

Euippe or Evippe (Ancient Greek: Εὐίππη, romanized: Euíppē, lit. 'good mare'), daughter of Tyrimmas, King of Dodona, She bore Odysseus a son, Euryalus, who was later mistakenly slain by his father.
