= Abarbarea =

Name of two nymphs

In classical Greek and Roman mythology, Abarbarea (Ancient Greek: Ἀβαρβαρέη, romanized: Abarbaree, lit. 'unmuddy') is the name of two nymphs:

- Abarbarea, naiad wife of Bucolion.
- Abarbarea, naiad ancestor of the Tyrians.

Other writers do not mention this nymph, but Hesychius mentions "Abarbareai" (Ἀβαρβαρέαι) or "Abarbalaiai" (Ἀβαρβαλαια) as the name of a class of nymphs.
