= Pedasus (Messenia) =

Pedasus or Pedasos (Ancient Greek: Πήδασος) was a town of ancient Messenia, mentioned by Homer in the Iliad as one of the seven towns of Messenia offered by Agamemnon to Achilles, and described by him as ἀμπελόεσσα ('vine-covered'). Ancient authors identify its location with the later Methone.
