= Francesco Righetti =

Argentine architect (1835-1917)

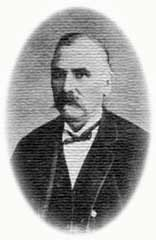
- Architect Francesco Righetti
- Born: 1835; Breno, Switzerland
- Died: 1917 (aged 81–82); Rosario, Argentina
- Occupation: Architect

Francesco Righetti (also known in Spanish as Francisco Righetti) was an Argentine architect who developed most of his works in Argentina, which would become his place of residence.

Among his most notable works are the Legislative Palace of Salta and the bell towers of San Francisco Church and the Church of the Vine, which are among the highest bell towers in Argentina, designed by the German Argentine José Enrique Teodoro Rauch and constructed under Righetti. He also participated in the latest reform of the Cathedral of Salta and planning Plaza Güemes.

== Personal life ==
Righetti was married to Josefa Ferrini and had a daughter named Albertina.

He died in Rosario, Santa Fe, Argentina in 1917.

== Gallery ==
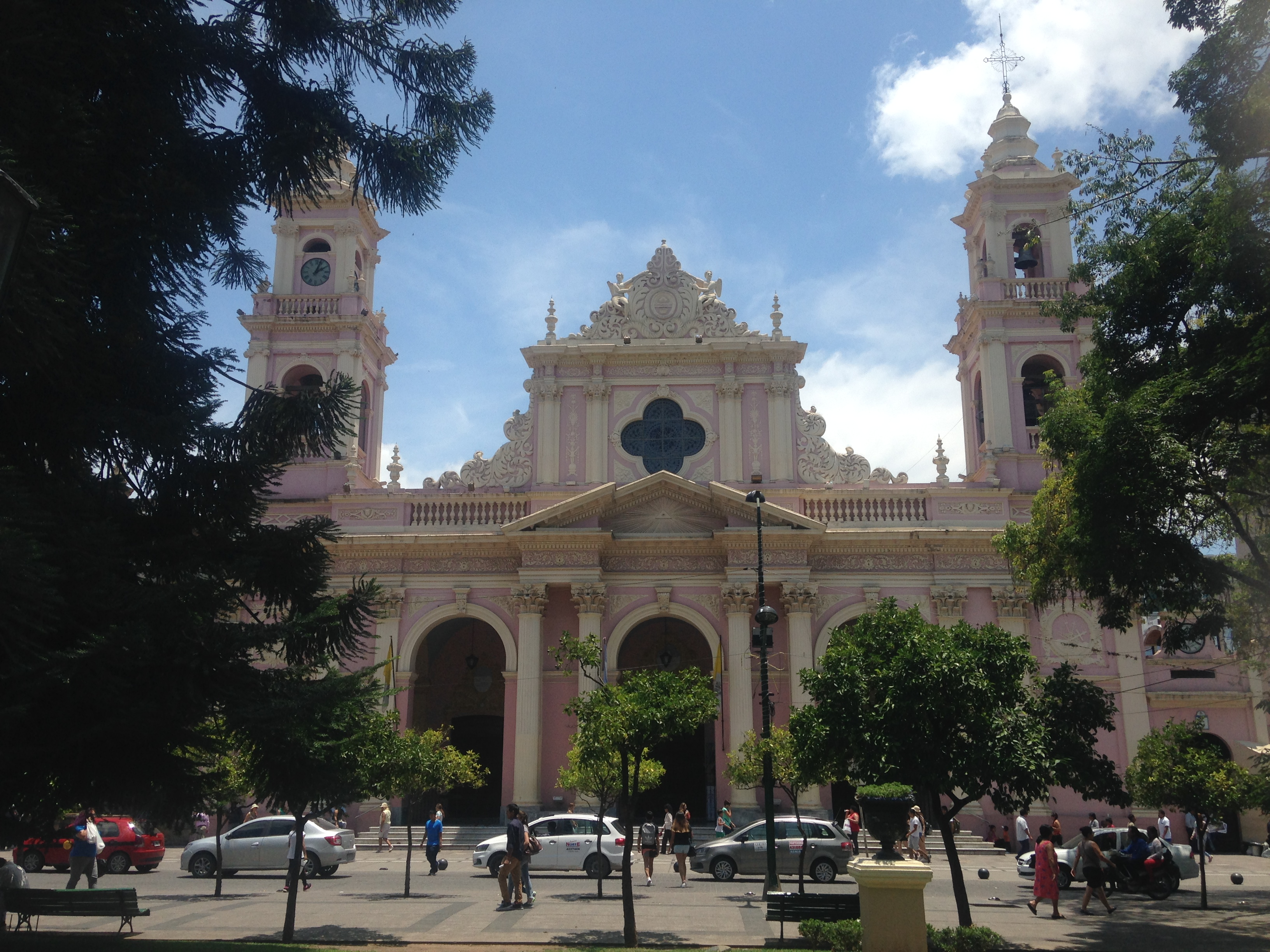
Salta Cathedral

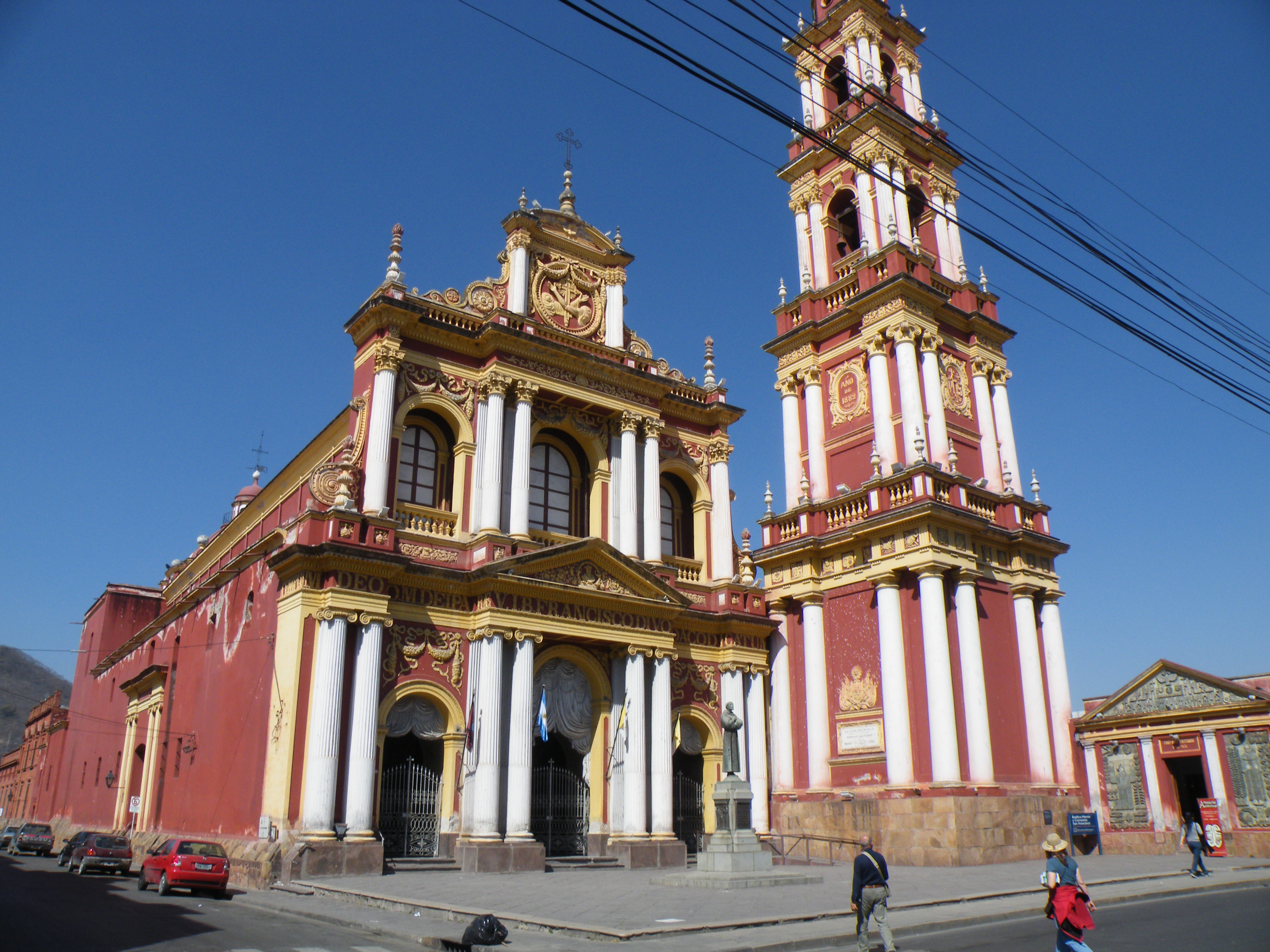
San Francisco Church

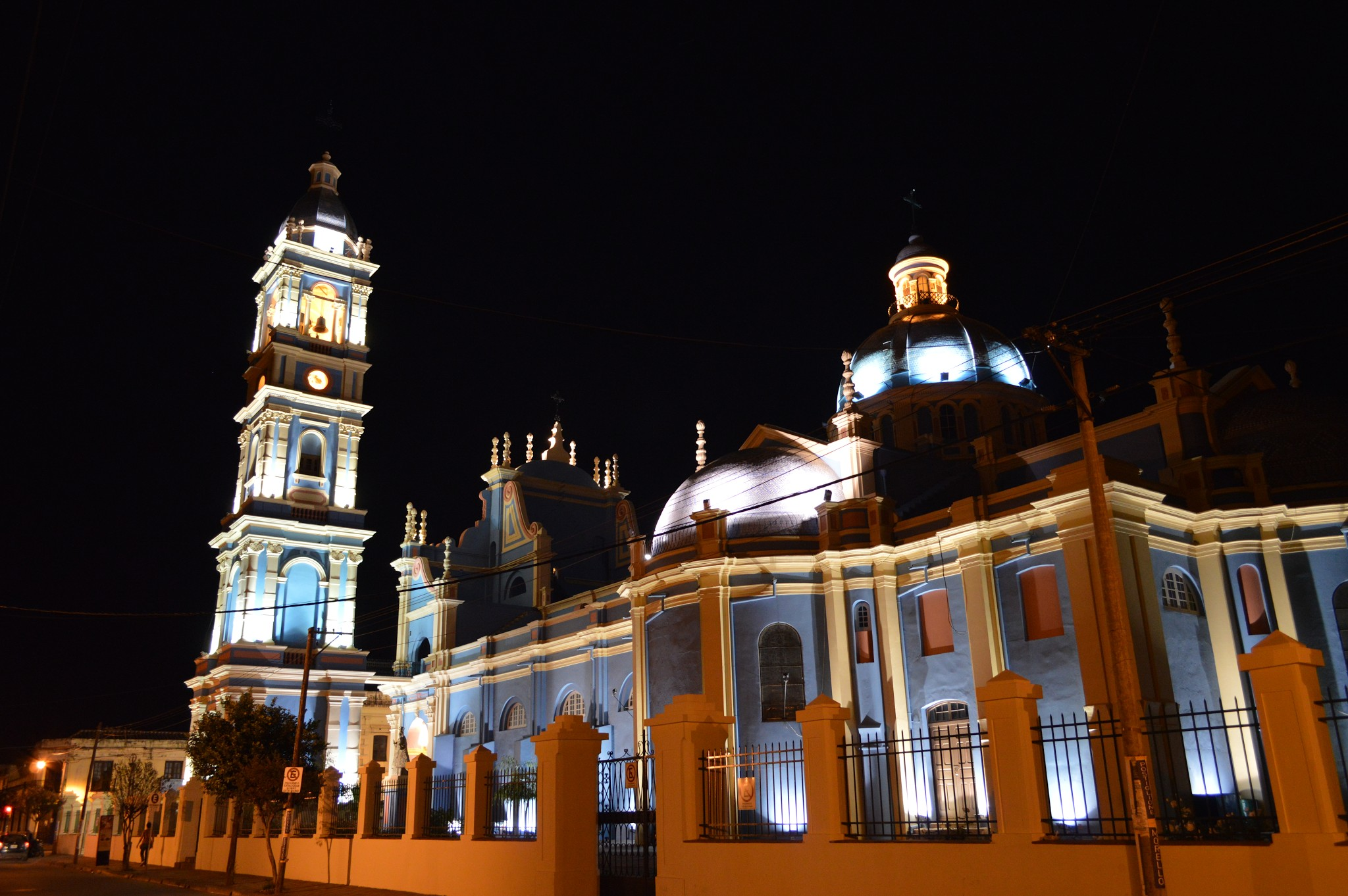
Church of the Vine

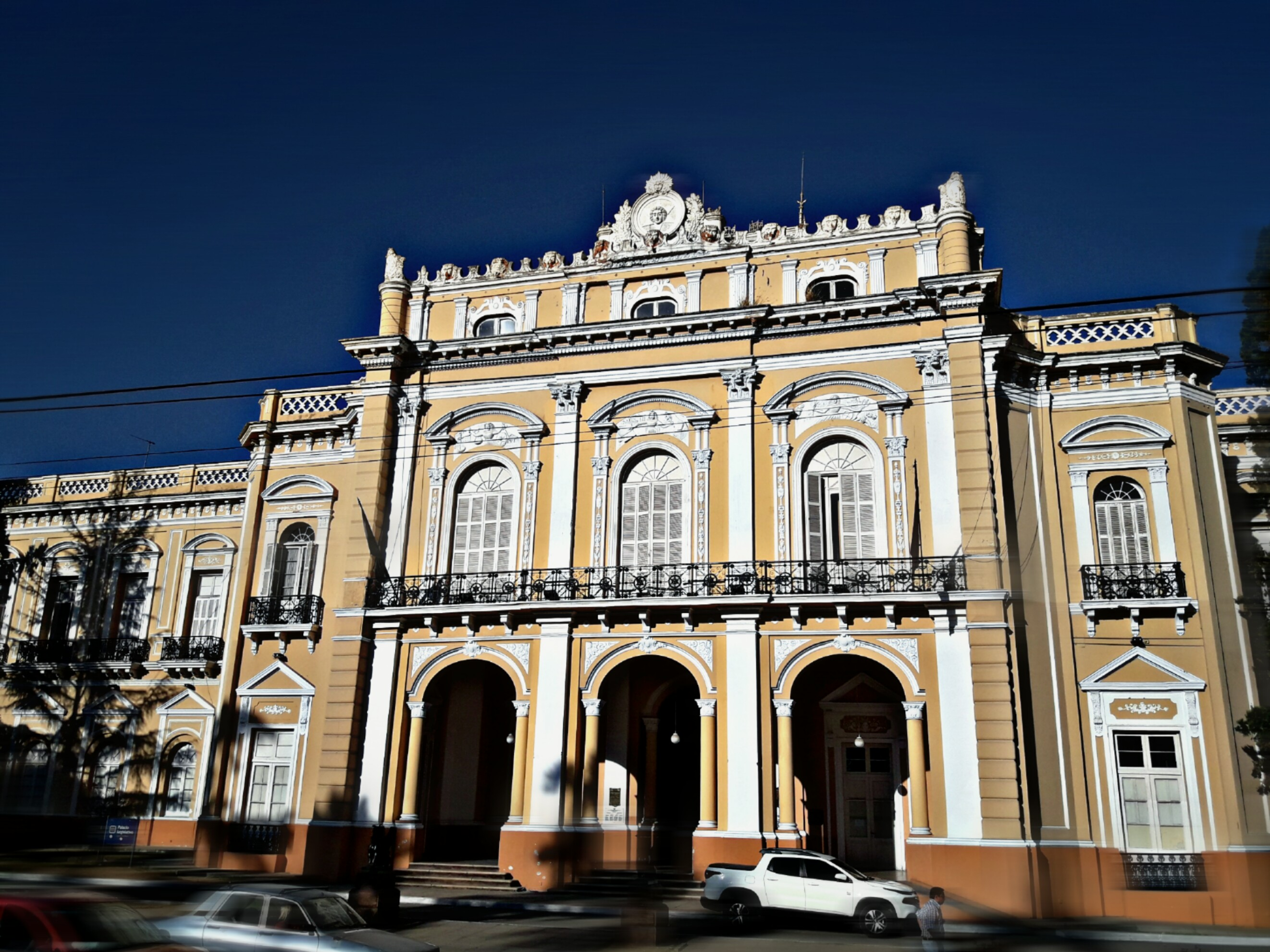
Legislative Palace of Salta
