= Methone (Messenia) =

Town in the southwestern corner of ancient Messenia

Coordinates: 36°49′01″N 21°42′18″E

Methone (Ancient Greek: Μεθώνη, Methṓnē) or Mothone (Μοθώνη, Mothṓnē) was a town in the southwestern corner of ancient Messenia. It was an important place in ancient times on account of its excellent harbour and salubrious situation. It is situated at the extreme point of a rocky ridge, which runs into the sea, opposite the island Sapientza, one of the group called in ancient times Oenussae. Off the outer end of the town, is the little insulated rock which Pausanias calls Mothon, and which he describes as forming at once a narrow entrance and a shelter to the harbour of his time: in the 19th century, when visited by William Martin Leake, it was occupied by a tower and lantern, which is connected by a bridge with the fortification of modern Methoni. A mole branched from it, which ran parallel to the eastern wall of the town, and forms a harbour for small vessels, which to Leake seems to be exactly in the position of the ancient port, the entrance into which was probably where the bridge now stands.

According to the testimony of the ancient writers, Methone was the Homeric Pedasus, one of the seven cities which Agamemnon offered to Achilles. Homer gives to Pedasus the epithet ἀμπελόεσσα (vine-covered), and Methone seems to have been celebrated in antiquity for the cultivation of the vine. The eponymous heroine Methone, is called the daughter of Oeneus, the 'wineman'; and the same name occurs in the islands Oenussae, lying opposite the city. The name of Methone first occurs in the Messenian Wars. Methone and Pylus were the only two places which the Messenians continued to hold in the Second Messenian War, after they had retired to the mountain fortress of Ira. At the end of the Second Messenian War, the Lacedaemonians gave Methone to the inhabitants of Nauplia, who had lately been expelled from their own city by the Argives. The descendants of the Nauplians continued to inhabit Methone, and were allowed to remain there even after the restoration of the Messenian state by Epaminondas. In the first year of the Peloponnesian War, 431 BCE, the Athenians attempted to obtain possession of Methone, but were repulsed by Brasidas. Methone suffered greatly from an attack of some Illyrian privateers, who, under the pretext of purchasing wine, entered into discussions with the inhabitants and carried off a great number of them. Shortly before the Battle of Actium, Methone, which had been strongly fortified by Mark Antony, was besieged and taken by Agrippa, who found there Bogud, king of Mauretania, whom he put to death. Methone was favoured by Trajan, who made it a free city. Pausanias found at Methone a temple of Athena Anemotis, the 'storm-stiller,' and one of Artemis. He also mentions a well of bituminous water, similar both in smell and colour to the ointment of Cyzicus. It is also mentioned by Pomponius Mela, Pliny the Elder, Ptolemy, and Hierocles.

Its site is located near the modern Methoni. The ancient city lies mostly underwater, and has been excavated by the Greek Ephorate of Underwater Antiquities.
