= Astacia =

Character in Greek mythology

In Greek mythology, Astacia (Ancient Greek: Ἀστακία) was a nymph whom after her Dionysus named a city.
