= Hymnus (Greek mythology) =

Shepherd in the Dionysiaca

In Nonnus' Dionysiaca, Hymnus (Ancient Greek: Ὕμνος, romanized: Húmnos, lit. 'hymn') is a young shepherd who fell in love with the nymph Nicaea, was rejected by her, and ended up dying by her hand.

== Mythology ==
Hymnus (meaning "hymn") was a young shepherd whom Eros, the god of love, made fall in love with a nymph named Nicaea with a single arrow; Nicaea however was a virgin who wished to remain unmarried, and shunned all possible suitors. One day, a lovesick and desperate Hymnus stole Nicaea's hunting gear, her arrows, her nets, her lance, and quiver, lamenting his misfortune. Nicaea caught him in the action, and he pressured her to shoot him in the heart, so that he might be freed from the soreness of unrequited love. Angered with him, Nicaea obliged and fulfilled with his wish. Hymnus was greatly mourned; Adrasteia, a goddess of justice, alerted Aphrodite and Eros of Nicaea's deeds. Eros then found Dionysus, and shoot him with one of his love arrows, which made Dionysus fall in love with Nicaea, and would eventually culminate in the nymph's rape by him.

== In ancient culture ==
Hymnus only appears in Nonnus' late (fifth century) rendition of the myth; he is not mentioned in the account of Memnon of Heraclea, a native of Bithynia (the region where the city of Nicaea was) who also recorded the story of Nicaea's rape by Dionysus.

== See also ==
- Aura
- Daphne
- Erotes

== Bibliography ==
- Grimal, Pierre, The Dictionary of Classical Mythology, Wiley-Blackwell, 1996. ISBN 978-0-631-20102-1.
- Nonnus of Panopolis, Dionysiaca. 3 Vols. W.H.D. Rouse. Cambridge, MA., Harvard University Press; London, William Heinemann, Ltd. 1940-1942. Greek text available at the Perseus Digital Library.
