= Telete =

Daughter of Dionysus in Greek mythology

- Goddess of festivity and rituals
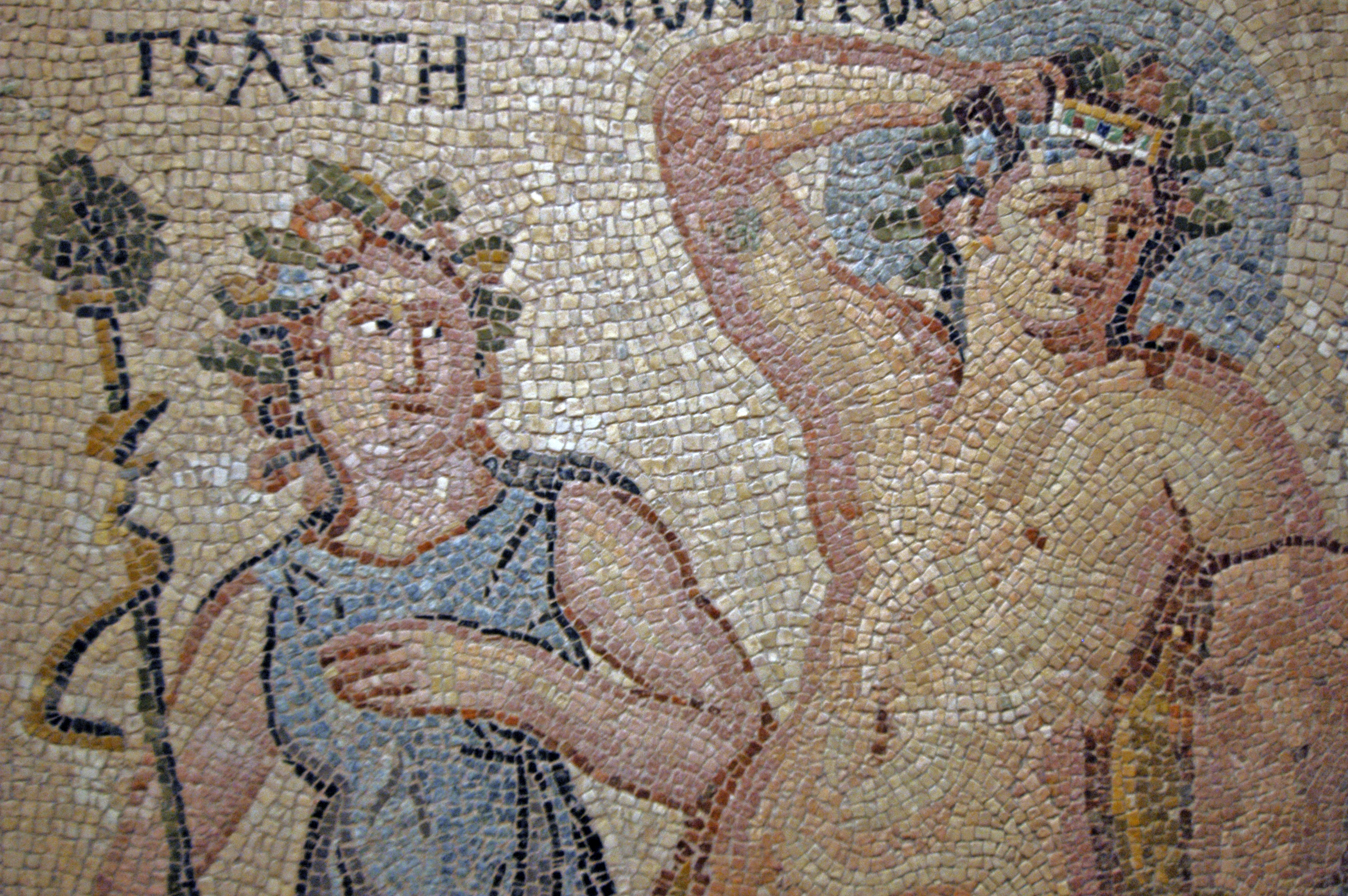
- Telete and Dionysus in a mosaic from Zeugma Mosaic Museum
- Major cult center: Boeotia
- Abode: Earth
- Symbols: Thyrsus

Genealogy
- Parents: Dionysus and Nicaea
- Siblings: Satyrus, several paternal half-siblings

In Greek mythology, Telete (/ˈtɛlɪtiː/; Ancient Greek: Τελετή, romanized: Teletḗ, lit. 'consecration') is the daughter of the wine-god Dionysus and Nicaea, a Naiad daughter of the river-god Sangarius and Cybele, a mother goddess.

== Mythology ==
Concerning Telete's birth, it is related that Nicaea was ashamed of having been made pregnant by Dionysus, and even attempted to hang herself; nevertheless, in due time a daughter was born to her. The Horae were said to have served as midwives at Telete's birth. Telete was destined by Dionysus to become a follower of himself and his son Iacchus, her half-brother.

Pausanias mentions a statue of Telete in the sanctuary of the Heliconian Muses in Boeotia. Her image was next to that of Orpheus.

Telete was associated with nighttime festivities and ritual dances in honor of Dionysus, and has been interpreted as a goddess of initiation into the Bacchic rites.
