= Bucolion =

In Greek mythology, may refer to one of four individuals

Bucolion (Ancient Greek: Βουκολίων, romanized: Boukolíon) may refer to the following:

- Bucolion, an Arcadian prince as one of the 50 sons of the impious King Lycaon either by the naiad Cyllene, Nonacris or by unknown woman. He and his siblings were the most nefarious and carefree of all people. To test them, Zeus visited them in the form of a peasant. These brothers mixed the entrails of a child into the god's meal, whereupon the enraged Zeus threw the meal over the table. Bucolion was killed, along with his brothers and their father, by a lightning bolt of the god.
- Bucolion, also Boucolides, was eldest but illegitimate son of the Trojan king Laomedon and the nymph Calybe. His wife was the naiad Abarbarea, and they had at least two sons, Aesepus and Pedasus. Aesepus and Pedasus participated in the Trojan War. According to Tzetzes, Bucolion and Abarbarea were the parents of the Trojan hero Euphorbus who was otherwise known as the son of Panthous and Phrontis.
- Bucolion, an Achaean soldier who fought in the Trojan War. He was slain by the Mysian Eurypylus.
- Bucolion, king of Arcadia who he succeeded his father Holaeas, son of Cypselus. He was the father of Phialus.
- Bucolion (Βουκολιών), a place in Arcadia of uncertain site, to which the Mantineans retreated, when they were defeated by the Tegeatae in 423 BC during the Peloponnesian War.
