= Euryalus =

Disambiguation article

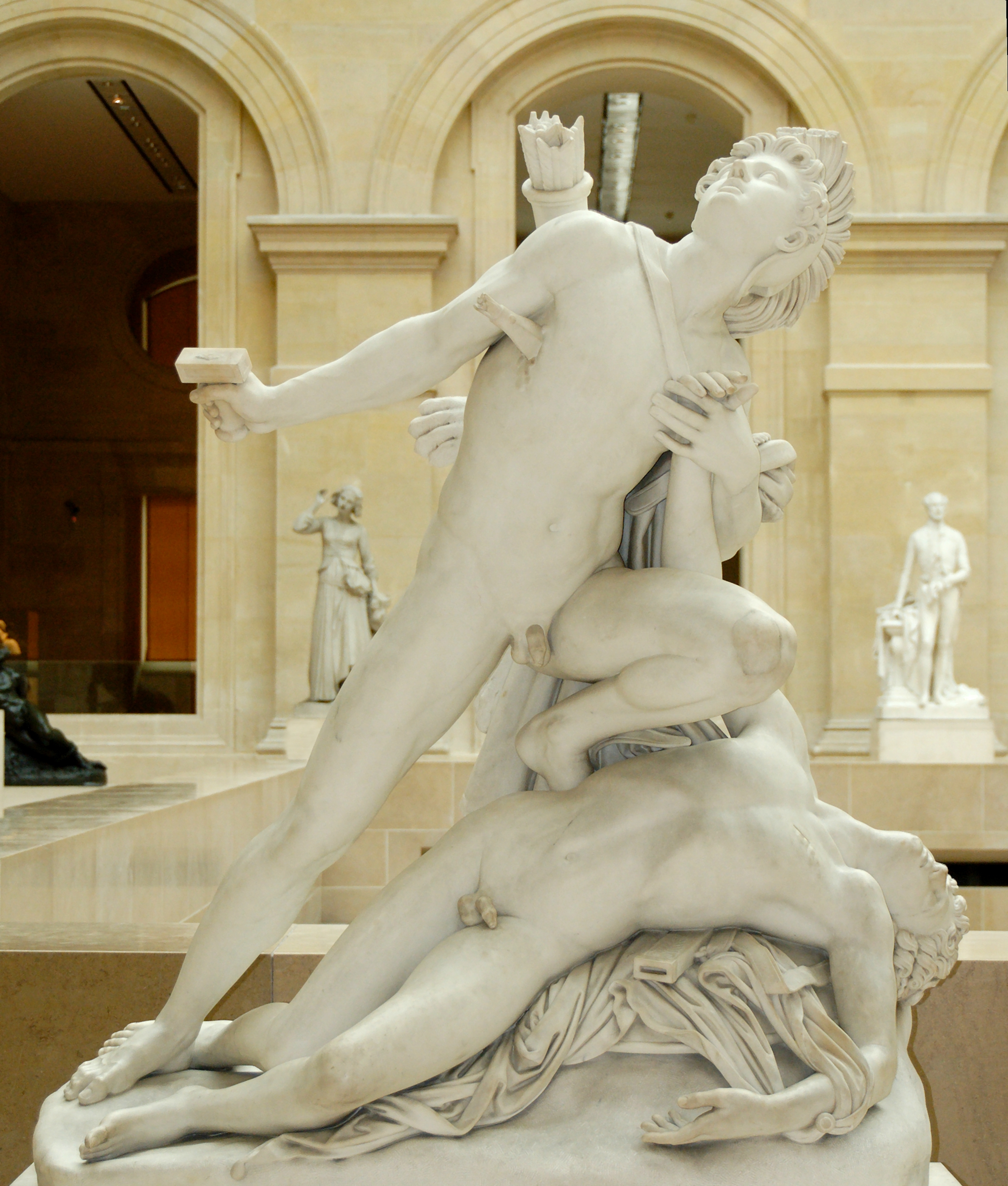
Nisus (top) and Euryalus (bottom) at the 1827 Salon

Euryalus (/jʊəˈraɪ.ələs/; Ancient Greek: Εὐρύαλος, romanized: Eurýalos, lit. 'broad') refers to the Euryalus fortress, the main citadel of Ancient Syracuse, and to several different characters from Greek mythology and classical literature:

== Classical mythology ==
- Euryalus, named on sixth and fifth century BC pottery as being one of the Giants who fought the Olympian gods in the Gigantomachy.
- Euryalus, a suitor of Hippodamia who, like all the suitors before Pelops, was killed by Oenomaus.
- Euryalus, one of the eight sons of Melas, who plotted against their uncle Oeneus and were slain by Tydeus.
- Euryalus, the Argive son of Mecisteus and Astyoche and one of the Argonauts. He attacked the city of Thebes as one of the Epigoni, who took the city and avenged the deaths of their fathers, who had also attempted to invade Thebes. In Homer's Iliad, he fought in the Trojan War, where he was brother-in-arms of Diomedes, and one of the Greeks to enter the Trojan Horse. He lost the boxing match to Epeius at the funeral games for Patroclus. During the funeral games for Achilles, Euryalus was the victor of the javelin-throwing contest, and received as a prize a bowl taken from King Mynes during Achilles' sack of Lyrnessus. He is also mentioned by Hyginus, who gives his parents as Pallas and Diomede.
- Euryalus (or Agrolas), brother and fellow builder of Hyperbius the Athenian.
- Euryalus, son of Euippe and Odysseus, who was mistakenly slain by his father for plotting against his father.
- Euryalus, son of Naubolus, one of the Phaeacians encountered by Odysseus in the Odyssey.
- Euryalus, one of the Suitors of Penelope who came from Dulichium along with other 56 wooers. Euryalus, with the other suitors, was slain by Odysseus with the aid of Eumaeus, Philoetius, and Telemachus.
- Euryalus, also one of the Suitors of Penelope from Zacynthus with other 43 wooers. He suffered the same fate as his above namesake.
- In the Aeneid by Virgil, Nisus and Euryalus are ideal friends and lovers, who died during a raid on the Rutulians.
- Euryalus, a surname of Apollo.

== Other uses ==
- Hyalophora euryalus, the ceanothus silkmoth, a species of moth of the family Saturniidae
- Protambulyx euryalus, a species of moth of the family Sphingidae
