= Acallaris =

In Greek mythology, the daughter of Eumedes

- Trojan Queen
- Member of the Royal House of Troy
- Abode: Troy
- Parents: Eumedes
- Consort: Tros
- Offspring: Assaracus

In Greek mythology, Acallaris (Ancient Greek: Ἀκαλλαρίς) was the daughter of Eumedes. According to some accounts she married the Trojan king, Tros of whom she had a son Assaracus, also a king of Troy. Some writers gave the name Callirrhoe, daughter of the river god Scamander as the wife of Tros and became the mother of his sons. Other possible children of Tros and Acallaris are Ilus, Ganymede, Cleopatra and Cleomestra.

== Family ==
The writer Dionysius of Halicarnassus, wrote a passage about Acallaris' descendants as the wife of Tros:

"of Tros and Acallaris, the daughter of Eumedes, Assaracus; of Assaracus and Clytodora, the daughter of Laomedon, Capys; of Capys and a Naiad nymph, Hieromnemê, Anchises; of Anchises and Aphroditê, Aeneas."

== Genealogical tree ==
Trojan race

Oceanus | Tethys
Atlas | Pleione | Scamander | Idaea | Simoeis
Zeus/Jupiter | Electra | Teucer
Dardanus | Batea
Ilus | Erichthonius | Astyoche
Callirrhoe | Tros
Ilus | Ganymede | Assaracus | Hieromneme
Laomedon | Themiste | Capys
Priam | Anchises | Aphrodite/Venus | Latinus
Creusa | Aeneas | Lavinia
Ascanius | Silvius
Aeneas Silvius
Latinus Silvius
Alba
Atys
Capys
Capetus
Tiberinus Silvius
Agrippa
Romulus Silvius
Aventinus
Procas
Numitor | Amulius
Ares/Mars | Rhea Silvia/Ilia
Hersilia | Romulus | Remus
