= Clytodora =

Two characters in Greek mythology

Clytodora (Ancient Greek: Κλυτοδώρα, romanized: Klytodora) is a name in Greek mythology that may refer to:

- Clytodora, a Trojan princess as the daughter of Laomedon, probably either by Placia, Strymo (or Rhoeo), Leucippe or Zeuxippe. Clytodora was the (half) sister of Priam, Astyoche, Lampus, Hicetaon, Clytius, Cilla, Proclia, Aethilla, Medesicaste, and Hesione. She became the queen of Dardania when she married Assaracus and became the mother of Capys. In some accounts, the wife of Assaracus was called Hieromneme, the naiad daughter of Simoes.
- Clytodora, possible spouse of Minyas and mother of Clymene (Periclymene), Orchomenus, Presbon, Athamas, Diochthondas and Eteoclymene.
