= Skamandros =

Skamandros may refer to:

- Scamander, a Greek river god
- Scamander River, a river in Anatolia
- Scamandrus, a town in ancient Anatolia
