= Eurydice (daughter of Adrastus) =

In Greek mythology, Eurydice (/jʊəˈrɪdɪsi/; Ancient Greek: Εὐρυδίκη Eurydikē "wide justice", derived from ευρυς eurys "wide" and δικη dike "justice) was a queen of Troy as the wife of Ilus, founder of Ilium. She was the daughter of Adrastus and the mother of King Laomedon of Troy and possibly, of Themiste, Telecleia and Tithonus. In some accounts, Batia, daughter of Teucer was said to be the consort of Ilus but if the family tree recorded by Apollodorus is correct, Batia could hardly have been the wife of Ilus, since she was his great-grandmother. According to Hyginus, the wife of Ilus was called Leucippe, otherwise unknown.
