= Telecleia =

Trojan princess

In Greek mythology, Telecleia (Ancient Greek: Τηλέκλεια, romanized: Tēlékleia, lit. 'glory from afar') was a Trojan princess as the daughter of King Ilus of Troy and possibly, Eurydice or Leucippe. She was the (half) sister of Laomedon, Tithonus and Themiste. Telecleia married King Cisseus of Thrace and therefore, the mother of Theano, wife to Antenor, and also a possible mother of Hecuba.
