= Some Fairy Tales of the Ancient Greeks =

Book by Marion L. Adams from 1904

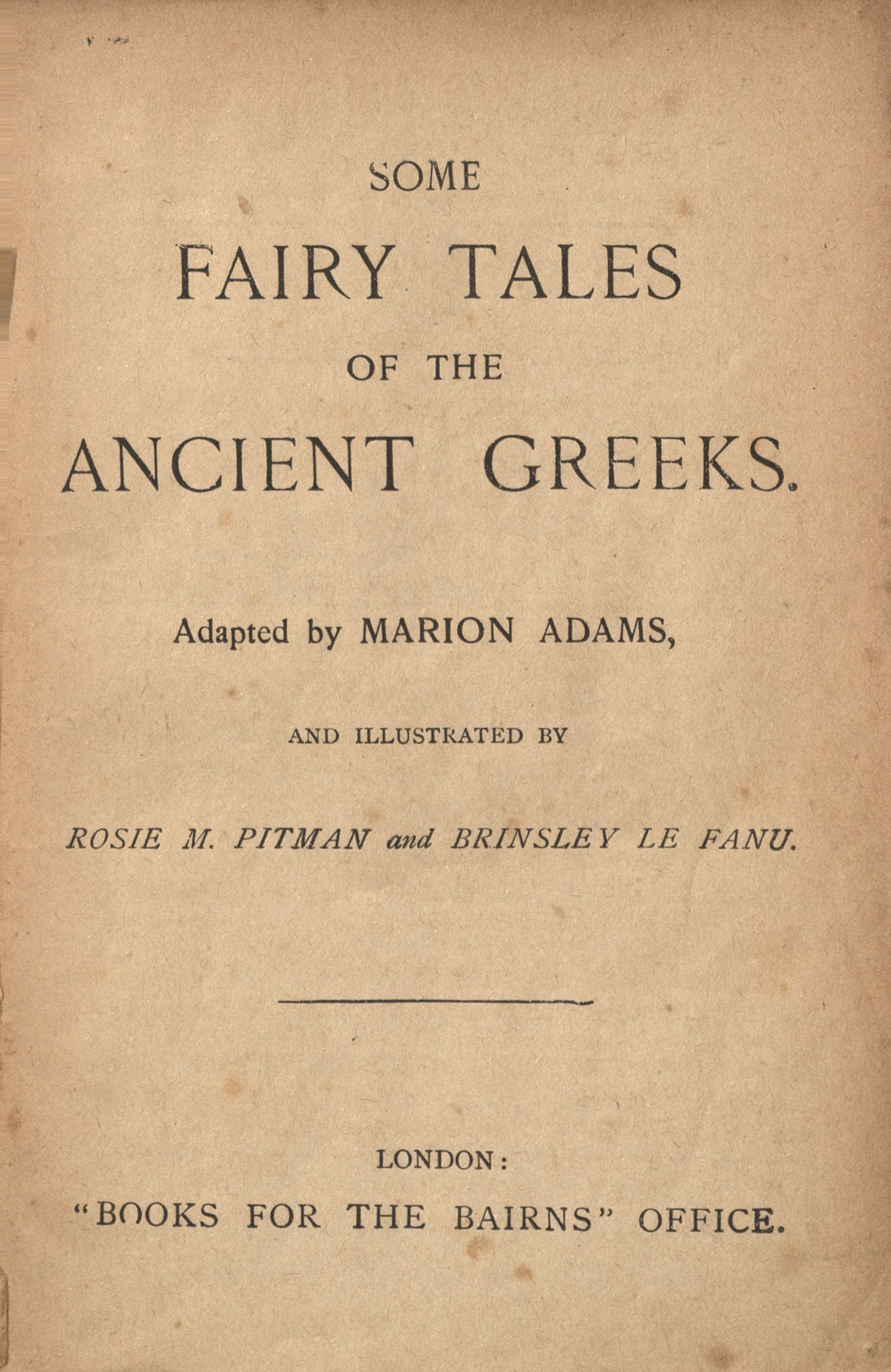
- Title cover
- Editor: W. T. Stead
- Author: Marion L. Adams
- Illustrators: Rosie M. Pitman, Brinsley Le Fanu
- Language: English
- Series: Books for the Bairns: 99
- Genre: Greek mythology, Children's literature
- Set in: Ancient Greece
- Publisher: "Books for the Bairns" office
- Publication date: May 1904
- Publication place: England
- Media type: Book
- Pages: 58
- OCLC: 61058517
- Preceded by: Pictures to Paint
- Followed by: Budgie and Toddie, by their Long Suffering Uncle

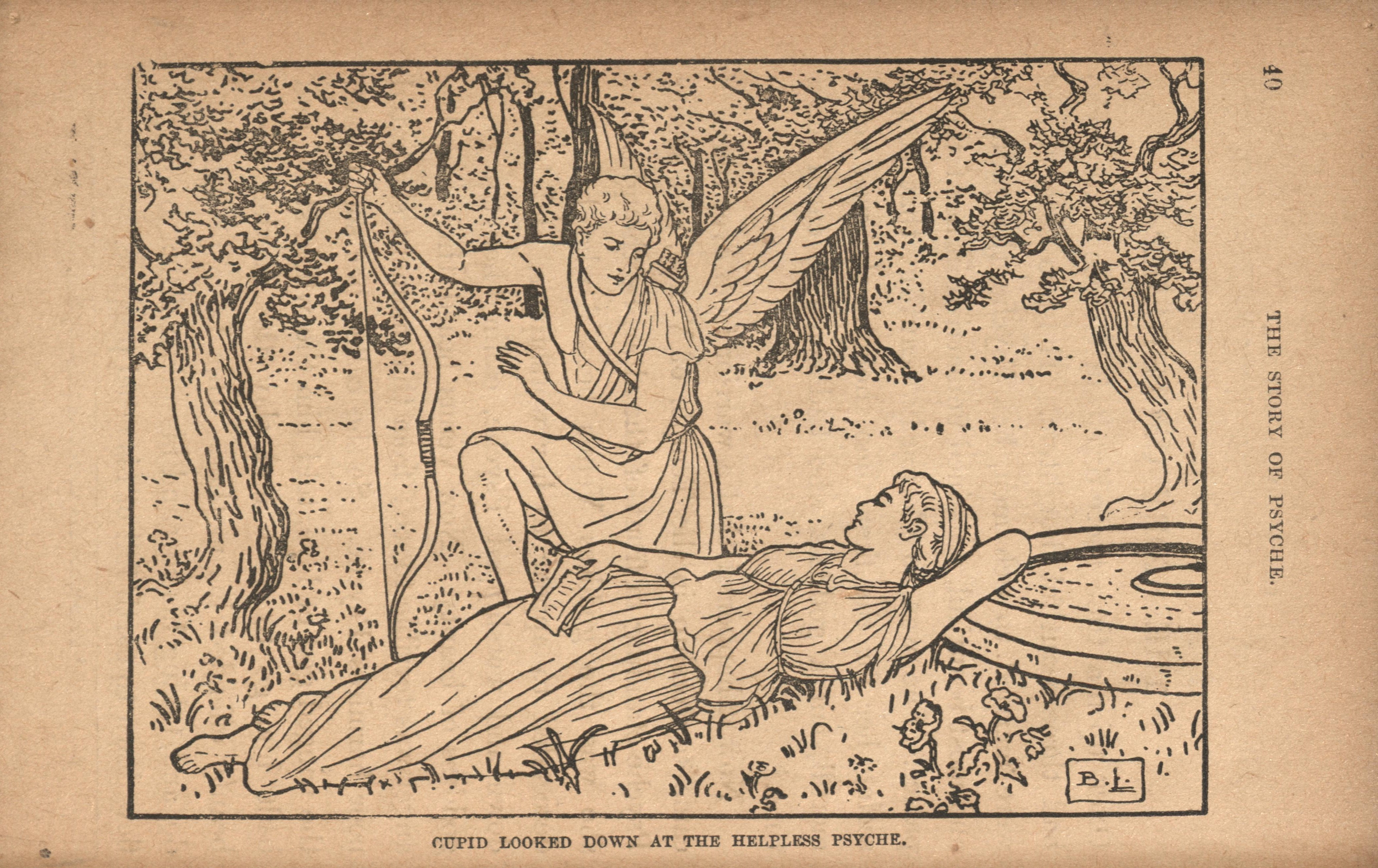
Cupid is ordered to kill Psyche, and finds her sleeping in the palace grounds

Some Fairy Tales of the Ancient Greeks is a children's Greek mythology novel by author Marion L. Adams. It was published in May 1904 in London by the "Books for the Bairns" office. It consists of six chapters, each telling the story of a different protagonist.

== Context ==
In the beginning of the 19th century, Greek mythology was "primarily the material for scholarship" to understand which influence Greek mythology has on literature and poetry. Only some books were used to teach school children. Greek mythology was sometimes seen as "heathen idolatry", but others justified from a Christian standpoint why these myths can be valuable to learn about, and how these myths emerged. In the middle of the 19th century, Nathaniel Hawthorne, Charles Kingsley and Thomas Bulfinch played an important role in introducing Greek mythology to children outside of the school context. Their success reflected an increasing demand for fairy tales and mythical stories, but these themes became broadly successful only at the end of the 19th century.

Some Fairy Tales of the Ancient Greeks was released as part of the children's book series Books for the Bairns and is issue number 99. This book series was founded to make books appealing and affordable to children, and to provide them with an opportunity to read. Before Adams released this book, she wrote others for this book series, including some playbooks and other books about fairy tales, such as Cinderella: A musical play, FairyTales from India, and Fairy Tales from Africa.

== Contents ==
The stories of the six chapters are independent of each other, and some characters appear in multiple chapters. Some Greek Gods or Goddesses are called by the name of their Roman counterparts, like Neptune or Diana. Chapters one through five contain monochrome illustrations which depict parts of the story. The sixth chapter does not contain any illustrations. The first chapter is about Aurora, the goddess of dawn, and her love story with Tithonus, son of Laomedon of Troy. The second chapter is about Diana, the goddess of the moon and hunting. Diana accidentally kills Orion, and rests his corpse and Orion's belt "among the stars". The third chapter is about Neptune, the god of the sea. His lover Scylla is, out of jealousy, transformed into a sea monster by Neptune's wife Amphitrite. The fourth chapter tells the story of Persephone and the Daffodils. Persephone is taken into the underworld by Hades. Her mother Demeter bargains with other Greek Gods of power that Persephone is allowed to leave the underworld for half of each year. The fifth chapter tells the story of Cupid and Psyche. The last chapter is about Apollo, the god of the sun. It describes how Apollo makes fun of Cupid, and Cupid punishes him by making Apollo fall in love with Daphne, but Daphne hates Apollo.

== Reception ==
The series Books for the Bairns was commercially successful, and even sold to other countries like France for the teaching of English. Some Fairy Tales of the Ancient Greeks was one of the most popular titles. In 1910, it was published in French as Contes fabuleux de la Grèce antique for Collection Stead, which included the most successful books.

In the years after the publication of Some Fairy Tales of the Ancient Greeks, Marion L. Adams wrote more books for the Books for the Bairns series, many of which are playbooks with fictional topics. These include Maid Marian, or, the rose of love: a fairy play in three scenes, Ali Baba and the forty thieves: a fairy-tale play and Bluebeard: a nursery tale play. Adams continued to write historical novels for juveniles. In 1905, Adams released Marjorie's Enemy –. A story of the Civil War Of 1644, a children's fiction novel set during the English Civil War. A year later in 1906, she released The Diamond Buckle: A Story of the French Revolution.
