= Leucippe =

Several characters in Greek mythology

In Greek mythology, Leucippe (Ancient Greek: Λευκίππη, lit. 'white horse') is the name of the following individuals:

- Leucippe, one of the 3,000 Oceanids, water-nymph daughters of the Titans Oceanus and his sister-spouse Tethys. Leucippe, along with her sisters, was one of the companions of Persephone when the maiden was abducted by Hades, the god of the Underworld.
- Leucippe, one of the Minyades, daughter of King Minyas of Orchomenus. It was her son that the sisters tore apart in their madness.
- Leucippe, the wife of King Thestius of Pleuron and mother of Iphiclus and Althaea.
- Leucippe, a queen of Troy as the wife of Ilus, founder of Ilium. By him, she became the mother of Laomedon and possibly, Themiste, Telecleia and Tithonus. In some accounts, the wife of Ilus was called Eurydice, daughter of Adrastus or Batia, daughter of Teucer.
- Leucippe, another Trojan queen as the wife of King Laomedon. According to the mythographer Apollodorus, she and Laomedon had five sons, Tithonus, Lampus, Clytius, Hicetaon, and Priam, and three daughters, Hesione, Cilla and Astyoche. Otherwise the wife of Laomedon was identified as Strymo, daughter of Scamander or Placia, daughter of Otreus or Zeuxippe.
- Leucippe, a daughter of Thestor and possibly Polymele, and thus, sister of Theonoe, Calchas and Theoclymenus. She became a priestess of Apollo and went from country to country in search of her father, Thestor and sister Theonoe who was stolen by pirates.
- Leucippe, mother of Egyptian king, Aegyptus by Hephaestus.
- Leucippe, mother of Teuthras the Mysian king. Her son killed a sacred boar of Artemis during hunt and was driven mad by the angry goddess. Lysippe then went out in the woods, seeking to find out what had happened to her son. Eventually she learned about the goddess' wrath from the seer Polyidus; she then sacrificed to the goddess to propitiate her, and Teuthras' sanity was restored.
- Leucippe, the wife of Euenor and mother of Cleito in Plato' s legend of Atlantis.
- Leucippe, the heroine of The Adventures of Leucippe and Cleitophon by Achilles Tatius
