= Hieromneme =

Minor Naiad

In Greek mythology, Hieromneme (/ˌhaɪərɒmˈniːmiː/; Ancient Greek: Ἱερομνήμη, romanized: Hieromnḗmē) was a minor naiad of Asia Minor. Her name means 'memory of the holy rites' which came from the words hierós and mnêma.

== Family ==
Hieromneme was a daughter of the river-god Simoïs, and the wife of Assaracus, by whom she bore Capys. Alternately, Hieromneme was the daughter-in-law of Assaracus, wife of Capys and mother of Anchises. In some accounts, Clytodora was called the wife of Assaracus while Themiste was regarded as the consort of Capys.

== Family tree ==
Trojan race

Oceanus	Tethys
Atlas	Pleione	Scamander	Idaea	Simoeis
Zeus/Jupiter	Electra	Teucer
Dardanus	Batea
Ilus	Erichthonius	Astyoche
Callirrhoe	Tros
Ilus	Ganymede	Assaracus	Hieromneme
Laomedon	Themiste	Capys
Priam	Anchises	Aphrodite/Venus	Latinus
Creusa	Aeneas	Lavinia
Ascanius	Silvius
Aeneas Silvius
Latinus Silvius
Alba
Atys
Capys
Capetus
Tiberinus Silvius
Agrippa
Romulus Silvius
Aventinus
Procas
Numitor	Amulius
Ares/Mars	Rhea Silvia/Ilia
Hersilia	Romulus	Remus
