= Cenchreae (Troad) =

Ancient city in the Troad

Coordinates: 39°57′49″N 26°37′44″E

Cenchreae or Kenchreai (Ancient Greek: Κεγχρεαί) was a city of the ancient Troad. According to Stephanus of Byzantium, the city was that "in which Homer lived while he was inquiring of the things that concerned the Trees.". Another tradition, of no more value, makes it the birthplace of Homer.

The city continued to exist as part of the Roman Empire, until the late Middle Ages. In the early 14th century, the town was filled with refugees from Mysia and primarily from Scamandrus, who were fleeing from Turkish raiders who invaded Western Anatolia, and who soon also reached Cenchreae. The Turks reduced the city by blockade, and when they entered it they pillaged it, killed the majority of its inhabitants and then set the town on fire, destroying it.

Its site is located near modern Kayalı Dağ.
