= Scamandria =

Town in ancient Mysia

Coordinates: 39°50′15″N 26°21′54″E

Scamandria or Skamandreia (Ancient Greek: Σκαμάνδρεια) was a small town in the ancient Troad in ancient Mysia, no doubt situated on the Scamander River in the plain of Troy.

Its site is located near Adatepe, Asiatic Turkey.
