= Aethilla =

Ancient Greek mythological figure

In Greek mythology, Aethilla or Aethylla (Ancient Greek: Αἴθιλλα or Αἴθυλλα) was Trojan princess as a daughter of King Laomedon and sister of Priam, Lampus, Hicetaon, Clytius, Hesione, Cilla, Astyoche, Proclia, Medesicaste and Clytodora.

== Mythology ==
After the fall of Troy Aethilla became the prisoner of Protesilaus, who took her, together with other captives, with him on his voyage home. He landed in Thrace in order to take in fresh water. While Protesilaus had gone inland, Aethilla persuaded her fellow prisoners to set fire to the ships. As a result of this being done, the Greeks were forced to remain on the spot and founded the town of Scione. According to other authors, the event took place in Italy; in commemoration of it, the nearby river received the name Nauaethus ("of the burning ships"), while Aethilla, Astyoche, and Medesicaste were surnamed the Nauprestidai ("they who set fire to ships").

In some accounts, it was a Trojan captive woman named Setaia who convinced her fellow prisoners to set fire to the ships. Setaia was crucified by the Greeks for doing so, but a town and a rock located on the spot where this had happened (not far from Sybaris) were named after her.

In Virgil's Aeneid, during Aeneas' and his fellow Trojans' stay in Sicily, some of the women set fire to their ships in order to make Aeneas settle where they were staying at the moment rather than sail further; even though the fire is quickly put down, several ships have been destroyed so some of Aeneas' people have to remain in Sicily, where they found Acesta (Segesta). This story is remarkably parallel to that of Aethilla and her fellow prisoners, but the characters are different: Virgil mentions Beroe, wife of a Doryclus, as the one who instigated the arson, and Pyrgo, the nurse of Priam, among those who supported her decision.

According to Strabo, the Sicilian river Neaethus (a variant for "Nauaethus") was called that because when "certain of the Achaeans who had strayed from the Trojan fleet" landed near it and went inland to explore the country, the Trojan women who were sailing with them, both being tired of the long voyage and having observed the fertility of the land, set fire to the ships in order to make the men stay there. Thus, Strabo's account contains elements of all the versions given above.
