= Eteoclymene =

In Greek mythology, Eteoclymene (Ancient Greek: Ετεοκλυμένη) was a Minyan princess as the daughter of King Minyas of Orchomenus probably either by Euryale, Clytodora, or Phanosyra, daughter of Paeon. Her possible siblings were Clymene, Periclymene, Orchomenus, Presbon, Athamas, Diochthondas, Elara, Persephone and the Minyades. In some accounts, Eteoclymene, Periclymene and Clymene are the same person.
