= Tithonus =

Mythological prince of Troy

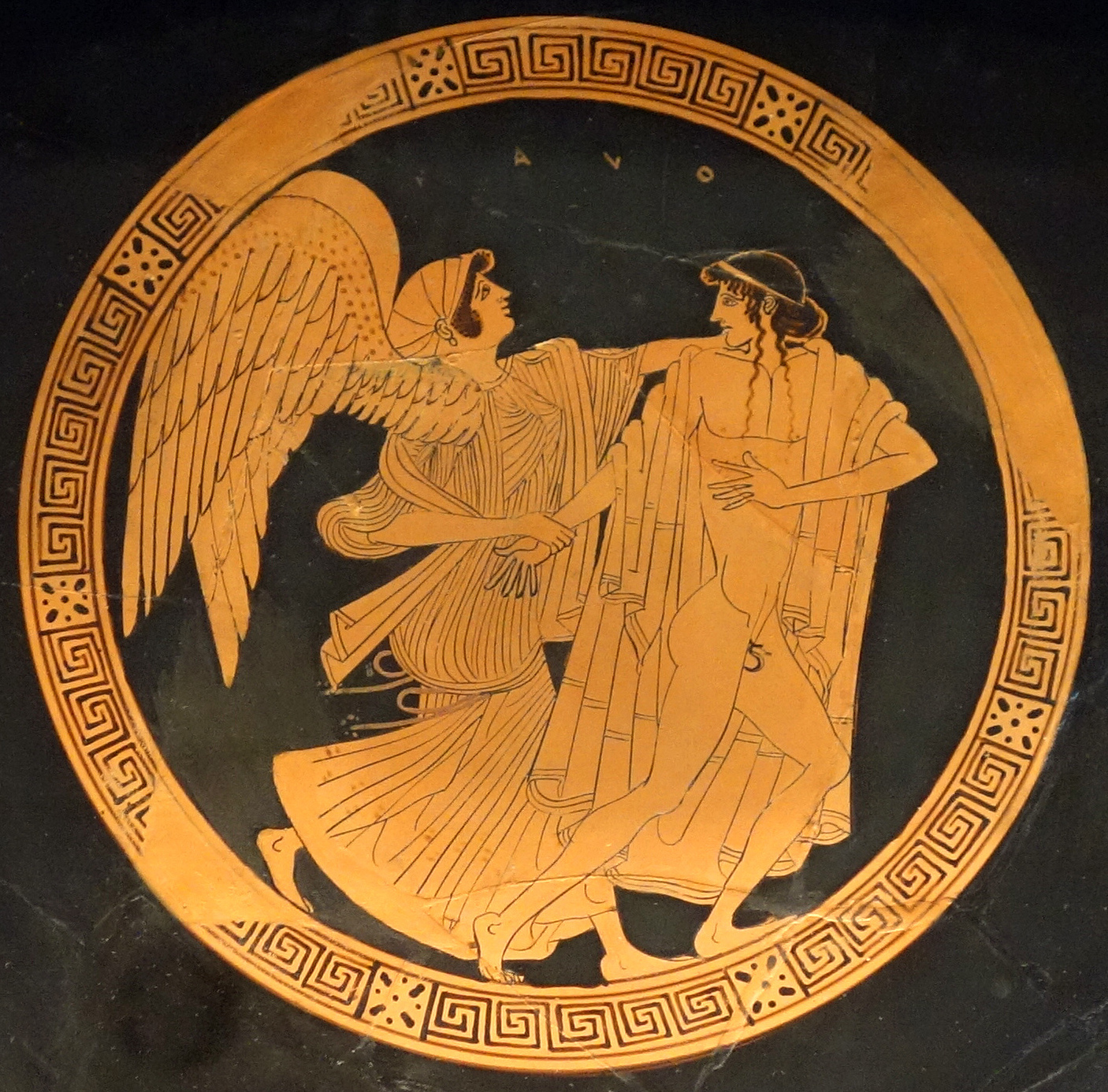
- Attic red-figure kylix with Eos and Tithonus, 5th century BC (Museum of Fine Arts, Boston)

Genealogy
- Parents: Laomedon of Troy and Strymo
- Siblings: Priam, Lampus, Hicetaon, Clytius, Hesione, Cilla, Astyoche, Proclia, Aethilla, Clytodora
- Consort: Eos
- Children: Memnon, Emathion

In Greek mythology, Tithonus (/tɪˈθoʊnəs/ or /taɪ-/; Ancient Greek: Τιθωνός, romanized: Tithonos) was the lover of Eos, Goddess of the Dawn. (Note: Daughter of the Titans Hyperion and Theia, Eos (Aurora in Latin) was the sister of Helios and Selene. As one of the major offspring of the Titans, she is sometimes referred to as one of the Titanides (a Titaness; the English plural "Titanesses" is rarely used), but like the Olympians, is usually described by the more general term "goddess".) He was a prince of Troy, the son of King Laomedon by the Naiad Strymo. (Note: In an alternative version of the myth, mentioned by Pseudo-Apollodorus, Tithonus was the son of Cephalus, another lover of Eos, and father of Phaethon.) The mythology reflected by the fifth-century vase-painters of Athens envisaged Tithonus as a rhapsode, as attested by the lyre in his hand, on an oinochoe (wine jug) of the Achilles Painter, circa 470–460 BC.

An asteroid (6998) has been named after Tithonus.

== Etymology ==
Tithonus has been taken by the allegorist to mean ‘a grant of a stretching-out’ (from teinō and ōnė), a reference to the stretching-out of his life, at Eos’s plea; but it is likely, rather, to have been a masculine form of Eos’s own name, Titonë – from titō, ‘day and onë, ‘queen’ – and to have meant ‘partner of the Queen of Day’.

== Mythology ==
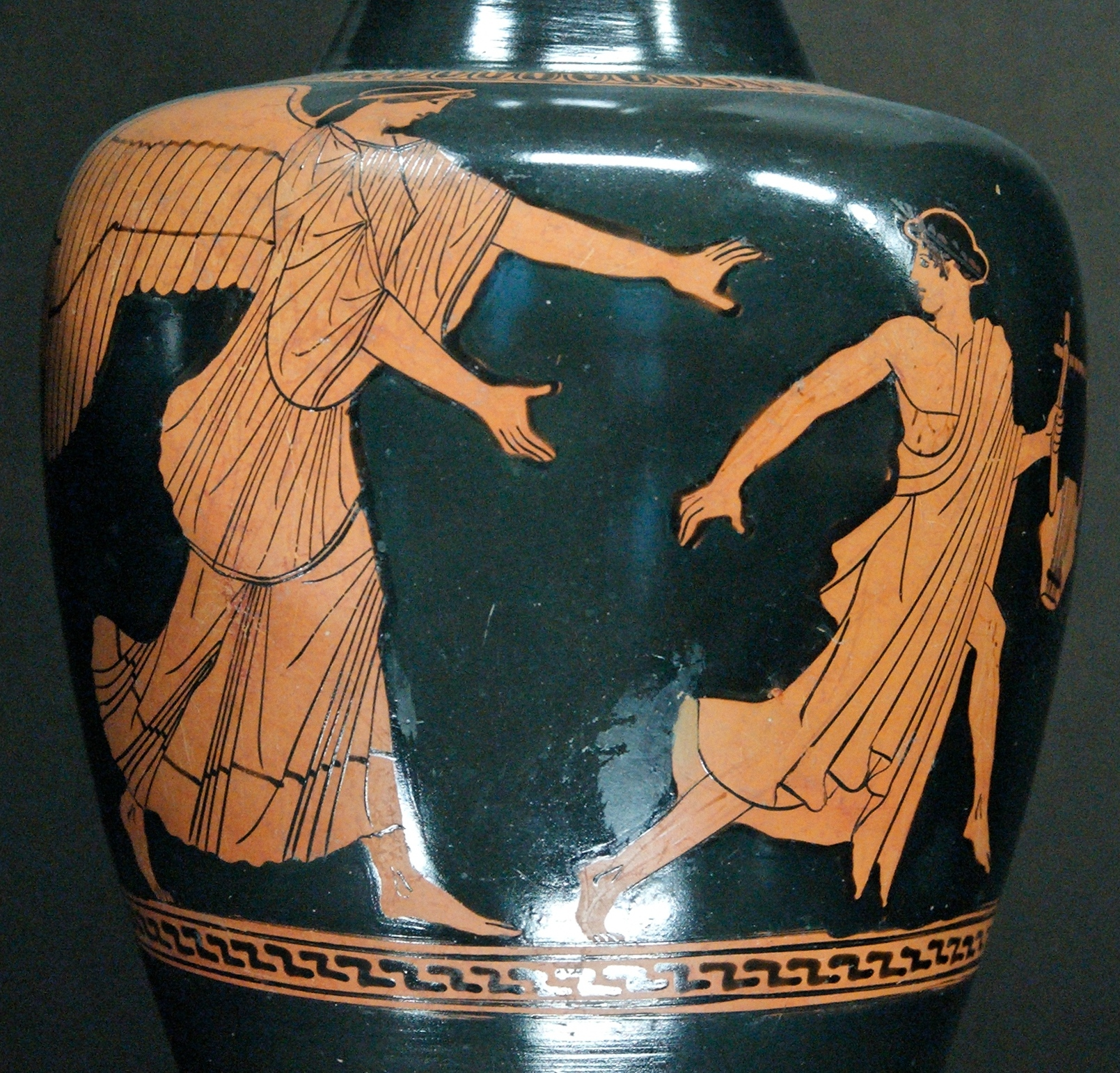
Eos pursues the reluctant Tithonus, who holds a lyre, on an Attic oinochoe of the Achilles Painter, c. 470–460 BC (Louvre).

Eos is said to have taken Tithonus, from the royal house of Troy, to be her lover. (Note: In the Homeric Hymn to Aphrodite, Tithonus is cited as an example to Anchises, another Trojan prince, later abducted by Aphrodite.) The myth of Eos and Tithonus' love was known to Homer, who wrote that in the morning Eos rose from the bed she shared with Tithonus in order to give her light to mankind in the openings of Iliad 11 and Odyssey 5, using the same description.

The mytheme of the goddess' mortal lover is an archaic one; when a role for Zeus was inserted, a bitter twist appeared: according to the Homeric Hymn to Aphrodite, when Eos asked Zeus to make Tithonus immortal, she forgot to ask that he be granted eternal youth. (Note: Compare the mytheme in its original, blissful form, in the pairing of Selene and Endymion, a myth that also associated with Asia Minor. Peter Walcot considers Tithonus a "corrective" example to the myth of Ganymede: "the example of Ganymedes promises too much, and might beguile Anchises into expecting too much, even an ageless immortality". ("The Homeric 'Hymn' to Aphrodite: A Literary Appraisal" in Greece & Rome 2nd Series, vol. 38, part 2 (October 1991), pp. 137–155, at 149.)) (Note: In one version, Zeus decided he wanted the beautiful youth Ganymede for himself; to repay Eos, he promised to fulfill one wish.) Tithonus indeed lived forever,

but when loathsome old age pressed full upon him, and he could not move nor lift his limbs, this seemed to her in her heart the best counsel: she laid him in a room and put to the shining doors. There he babbles endlessly, and no more has strength at all, such as once he had in his supple limbs.

In later tellings, he eventually became a cicada (tettix), eternally living, but begging for death to overcome him. (Note: In some variants, Eos deliberately turns Tithonus into a cricket or a cicada.) In the Olympian system, the "queenly" and "golden-throned" Eos can no longer grant immortality to her lover as Selene had done, but must ask it of Zeus, as a boon. In the account of Hieronymus of Rhodes from the third century BC, the blame is shifted from Eos onto Tithonus, who asked for immortality but not agelessness from his lover, who was then unable to help him otherwise and turned him into a cicada. Propertius wrote that Eos did not forsake Tithonus, old and aged as he was, and would still embrace him and hold him in her arms rather than leaving him deserted in his cold chamber, while cursing the gods for his cruel fate.

Eos bore Tithonus two sons, Memnon and Emathion. According to Quintus Smyrnaeus, Memnon was raised by the Hesperides on the coast of Oceanus. According to the historian Diodorus Siculus, Tithonus, who had travelled east from Troy into Assyria and founded Susa, was bribed with a golden grapevine to send his son Memnon to fight at Troy against the Greeks.

The Tithonus poem is one of the few nearly complete works of the Greek lyric poet Sappho, having been pieced together from fragments discovered over a period of more than a hundred years. (Note: The first modern printing of the complete poem was published in two sections by Michael Gronewald and Robert W. Daniel in Zeitschrift für Papyrologie und Epigraphik vol. 147, pp. 1–8, and vol. 149, pp. 1–4 (2004); an English translation by Martin West is printed in the Times Literary Supplement, 21 or 24 June 2005. The right half of this poem was previously found in fragment 58 L-P. The fully restored version can be found in M. L. West, "The New Sappho", in Zeitschrift für Papyrologie und Epigraphik, vol. 151, pp. 1–9 (2005).)

== In culture ==
This myth may have been used to explain why cicadas were particularly noisy during the early hours of the morning, when the dawn appears in the sky. Sir James George Frazer notes that among ancient Greeks and several other peoples there was a widespread belief that creatures that can shed their skin renew their youth and live forever. It may also be a reference to the fact that the high-pitched talk of old men was compared to the cicadas' singing, as seen in a passage from the Iliad. In fact the ancient Greeks would use a cicada sitting on a harp as an emblem of music.

Eos (as Thesan) and Tithonus (as Tinthu or Tinthun) provided a pictorial motif inscribed or cast in low relief on the backs of Etruscan bronze hand-mirrors. (Note: As on one in the Vatican Museums, Museo Gregoriano Etrusco, acc. no. 12241)

== In modern culture ==
- Tithonus as an aged immortal is mentioned in Book I, Canto II, Stanza VII of Edmund Spenser's The Faerie Queene.
- "Tithonus" by Alfred Tennyson was originally written as "Tithon" in 1833 and completed in 1859. The poem is a dramatic monologue in blank verse from the point of view of Tithonus. Unlike the original myth, it is Tithonus who asks for immortality, and it is Aurora, not Zeus, who grants this imperfect gift. As narrator, Tithonus laments his unnatural longevity, which separates him from the mortal world as well as from the immortal but beautiful Aurora.
- German philosopher Johann Gottfried Herder's book "Tithonus und Aurora" was published in 1792.
- "Tithon" is mentioned in the poem "On Imagination" by Phillis Wheatley.
- Sappho's "Old Age Poem", sometimes known as the "Tithonus poem", discusses beauty and ageing.

== See also ==
- Aurora
- Cumaean Sibyl, another mortal who was granted an extended lifetime but not eternal youth
- Tithonus (The X-Files), an episode of the X-Files that is a modern retelling of the story.
- Selemnus, a mortal man who was abandoned by his immortal lover after growing old
- Myia, another mythological insect.
