= Strymo =

In Greek mythology, Strymo (Ancient Greek: Στρυμώ, romanized: Strymō), also called Rhoeo, was the Trojan naiad daughter of the river god Scamander. She was the wife of King Laomedon of Troy, and mother of five sons, King Priam, Tithonus, Lampus, Clytius and Hicetaon, and three daughters, Hesione, Cilla and Astyoche.

In various accounts, Laomedon's wife was instead called either: 1) Placia, daughter of Otreus, 2) Zeuxippe or 3) Leucippe. According to Tzetzes, Priam and Tithonus were sons of Laomedon by different mothers; the mother of Priam was Leucippe while the mother of Tithonus was Strymo or Rhoeo, daughter of Scamander. According to another version of the myth, Tithonus was the son of Laomedon by Strymo, daughter of Scamander.
