= Priam at the Feet of Achilles =

1806 painting by Jérôme-Martin Langlois

- Priam aux pieds d'Achille (French)
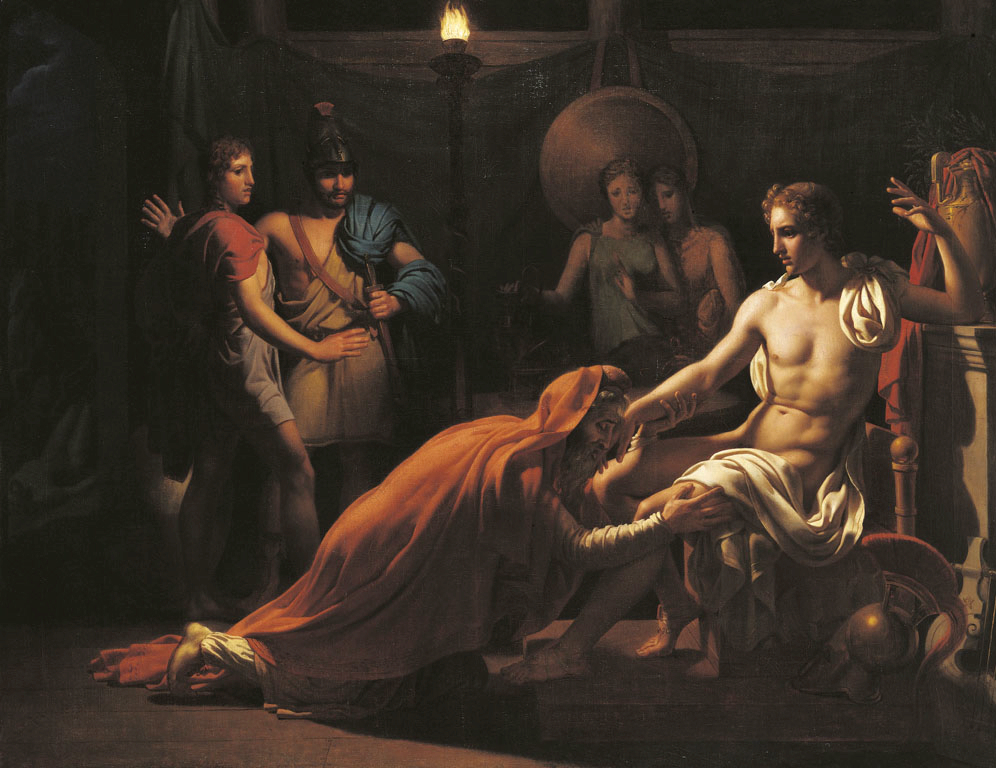
- Priam at the Feet of Achilles (1809)
- Artist: Jérôme-Martin Langlois
- Completion date: 1809
- Medium: oil-on-canvas
- Movement: Neoclassical style
- Subject: Fall of Troy
- Dimensions: 113 cm (44 in) x 146 cm (57 in)
- Location: Beaux-Arts de Paris, Paris

Priam at the Feet of Achilles (1809) or French Priam aux pieds d'Achille is an oil-on-canvas painting by the French artist Jérôme-Martin Langlois. The painting won first prize at the Grand Prix de Rome.

== History ==
Jérôme-Martin Langlois completed the painting titled Priam aux pieds d'Achille in 1809. It is housed at the Beaux-Arts de Paris.

== Description ==
The dimensions of the painting are 113 cm (44 in) x 146 cm (57 in). The subject is from the Iliad and shows Priam, who has entered the Greek camp to offer a ransom for his deceased son Hector's body. Achilles had been dragging the body of Hector behind his chariot as he circled the outer walls of Troy. The painting is a portrayal of the love of a father: in the painting Priam begs Achilles for the body of his son.

== Reception ==
The painting won first prize at the Grand Prix de Rome in 1809.
