= Priam =

Mythological king of Troy

Priam, Last King of Troy
- King of Troy
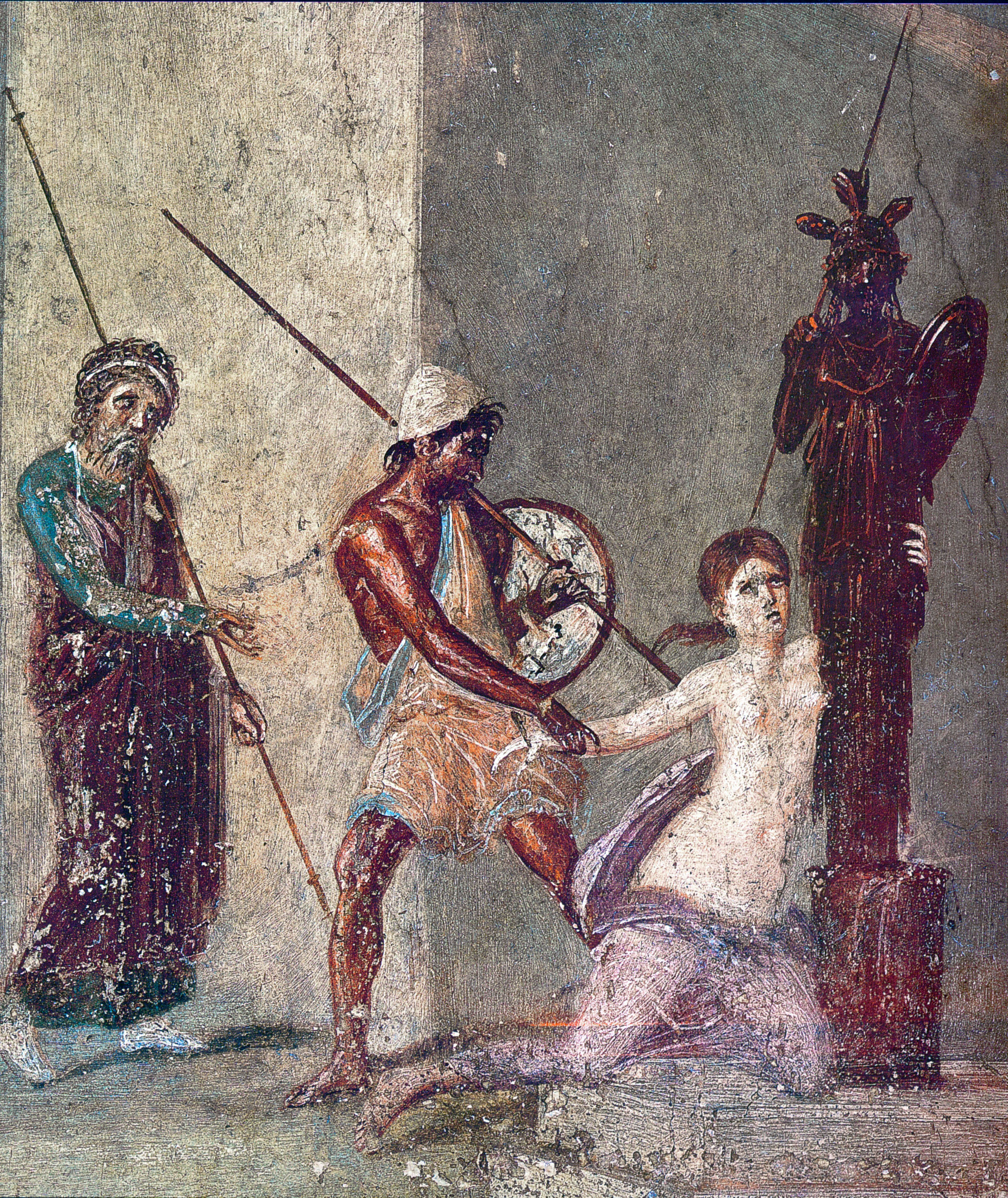
- Scene from the Trojan War: Cassandra clings to the Palladium, the wooden cult image of Athene, while Ajax the Lesser is about to drag her away in front of her father Priam (standing on the left).
- Predecessor: Laomedon

Genealogy
- Parents: Laomedon and Placia or Strymo (or Rhoeo) or Zeuxippe or Leucippe
- Siblings: Tithonus, Lampus, Hicetaon, Clytius, Antigone, Hesione, Cilla, Astyoche, Proclia, Aethilla, Medesicaste and Clytodora
- Consort: (1) Hecuba (2) Castianeira (3) Laothoe (4) Alexirrhoe or Arisbe (5) unknown
- Offspring: (1) Hector, Paris, Cassandra, Helenus, Deiphobus, Troilus, Laodice, Polyxena, Creusa, Polydorus, Polites, Antiphus, Pammon, Hipponous and Iliona (2) Gorgythion (3) Lycaon (4) Aesacus (5) others

In Greek mythology, Priam (/ˈpraɪ.əm/; Ancient Greek: Πρίαμος, pronounced [prí.amos]) was the legendary and last king of Troy during the Trojan War. He was the son of Laomedon. His many children included notable characters such as Hector, Paris, and Cassandra.

== Etymology ==
Most scholars take the etymology of the name from the Luwian 𒉺𒊑𒀀𒈬𒀀 (Pa-ri-a-mu-a-, or “exceptionally courageous”), attested as the name of a man from Zazlippa, in Kizzuwatna. A similar form is attested transcribed in Greek as Paramoas near Kaisareia in Cappadocia. Some have identified Priam with the historical figure of Piyama-Radu, a warlord active in the vicinity of Wilusa. However, this identification is disputed, and is highly unlikely, given that he was known in Hittite records as being an ally of the Ahhiyawa against Wilusa.

A popular folk etymology derives the name from the Greek verb priamai, meaning 'to buy'. This in turn gives rise to a story of Priam's sister Hesione ransoming his freedom with a veil, from Heracles, thereby 'buying' him. This story is attested in the Bibliotheca and in other influential mythographical works dated to the first and second centuries AD. These sources are, however, dated much later than the first attestations of the name Priamos or Pariya-muwas, and thus are more problematic.

== Description ==
Priam was described by the chronicler Malalas in his account of the Chronography as "tall for the age, big, good, ruddy-colored, light-eyed, long-nosed, eyebrows meeting, keen-eyed, gray, restrained." Meanwhile, in the account of Dares the Phrygian, he was illustrated as ". . .had a handsome face and a pleasant voice. He was large and swarthy."

== Marriage and children ==
See List of children of Priam

Priam is said to have fathered fifty sons and many daughters, with his chief wife Hecuba, daughter of the Phrygian king Dymas and many other wives and concubines. These children include famous mythological figures such as Hector, Paris, Helenus, Cassandra, Deiphobus, Troilus, Laodice, Polyxena, Creusa, and Polydorus. Priam was killed when he was around 80 years old by Achilles' son Neoptolemus.

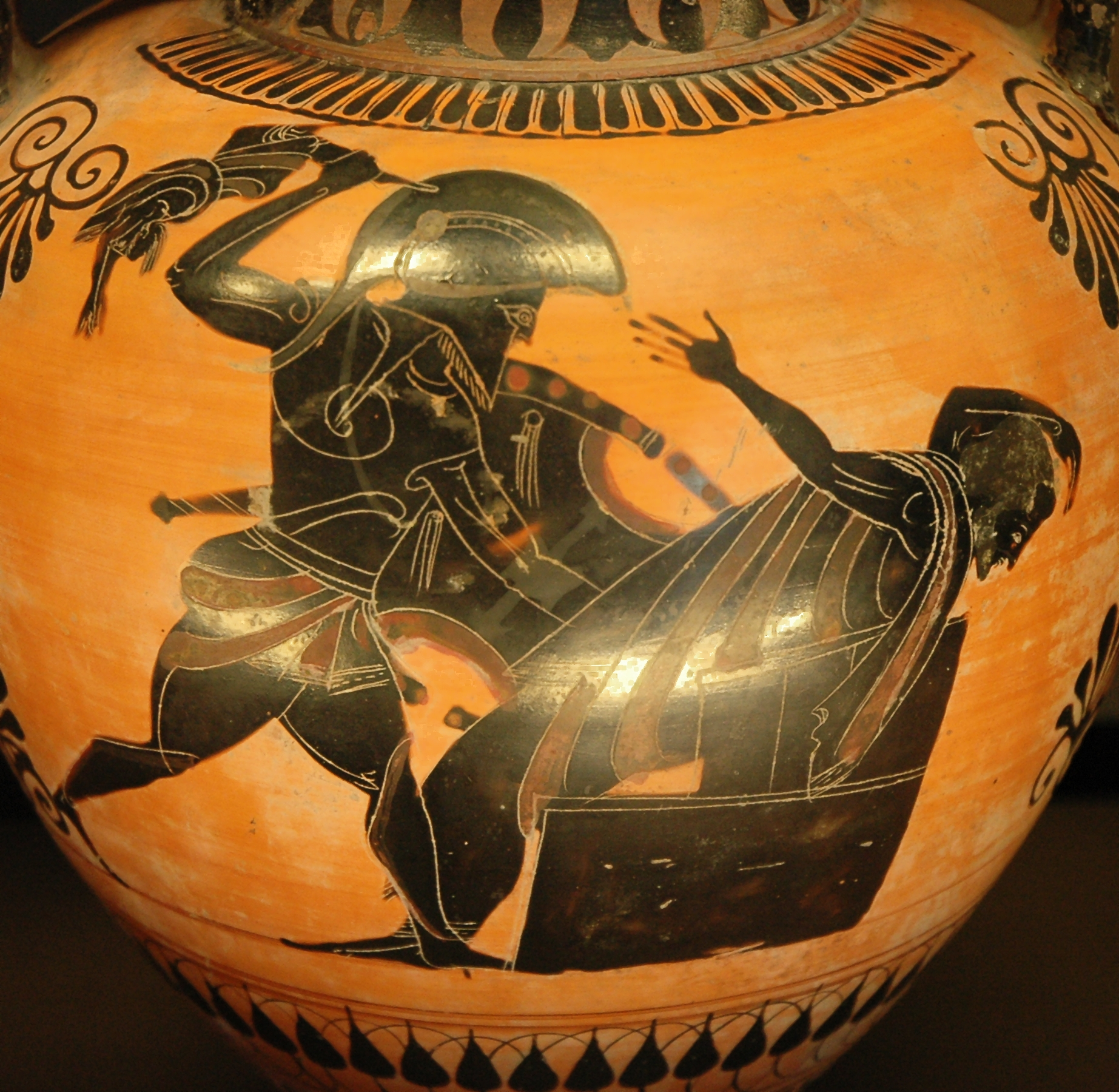
Priam killed by Neoptolemus, detail of an Attic black-figure amphora, ca. 520–510 BC

== Life ==
In Book 3 of Homer's Iliad, Priam tells Helen of Troy that he once helped King Mygdon of Phrygia in a battle against the Amazons.

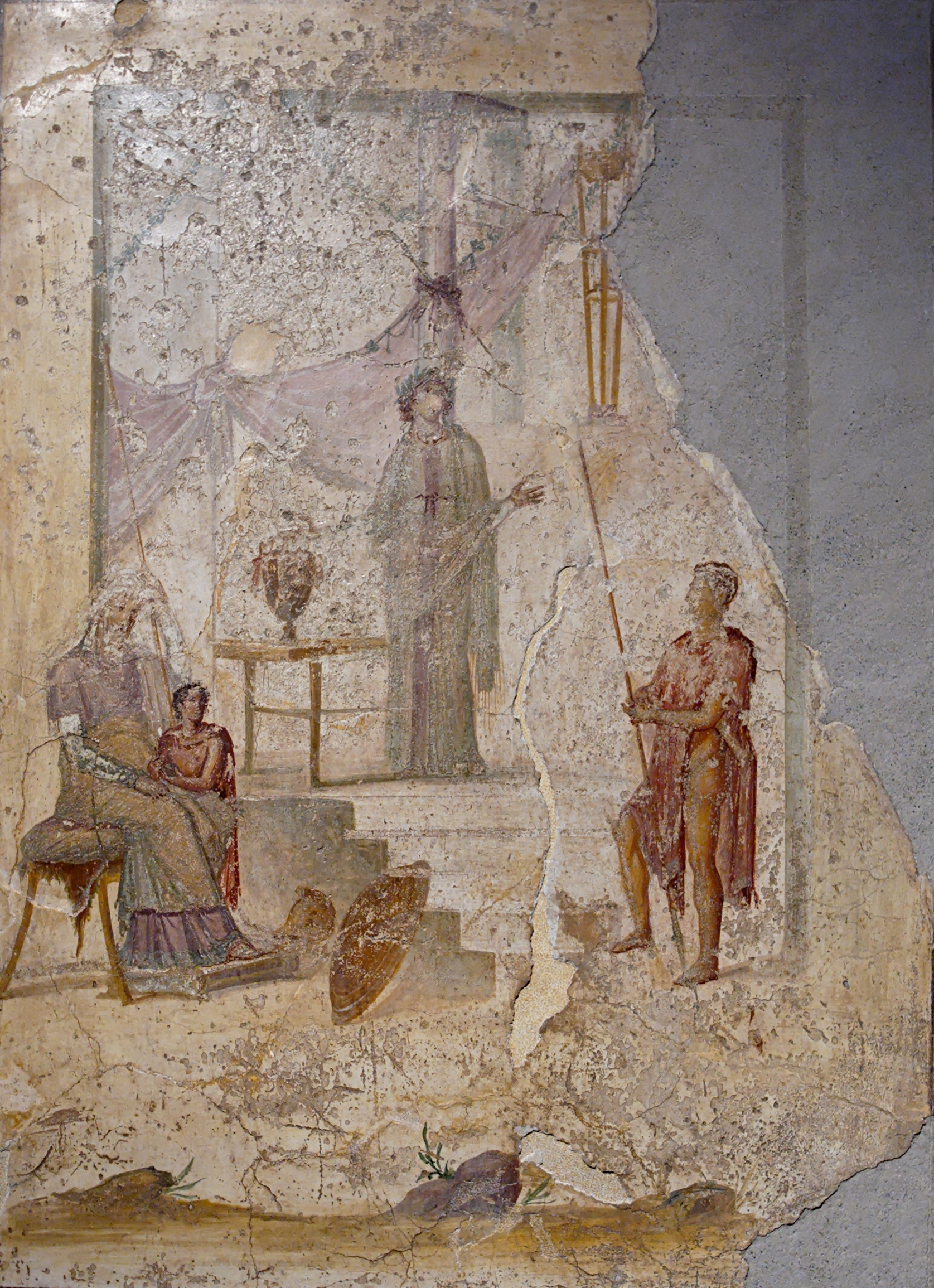
Priam with Paris, Cassandra and Hector. Fresco from Pompeii, c. 20-30 AD

When Hector is killed by Achilles, the Greek warrior treats the body with disrespect and refuses to give it back. According to Homer in book XXIV of the Iliad, Zeus sends the god Hermes to escort King Priam, Hector's father and the ruler of Troy, into the Greek camp. Priam tearfully pleads with Achilles to take pity on a father bereft of his son and return Hector's body. He invokes the memory of Achilles' own father, Peleus. Priam begs Achilles to pity him, saying, "I have endured what no one on earth has ever done before – I put my lips to the hands of the man who killed my son." Deeply moved by Priam's supplication, Achilles relents and returns Hector's corpse to the Trojans. Both sides agree to a temporary truce, and Achilles gives Priam leave to hold a proper funeral for Hector, complete with funeral games. He promises that no Greek will engage in combat for at least nine days, but on the twelfth day of peace, the Greeks would all stand once more and the mighty war would continue marking a brief, and very significant pause in the conflict portrayed by the Homeric narrative.

Priam’s body language in the scene demonstrates ancient gestures of humility, that conveyed vulnerability and heightened the force of his plea. His reliance on these traditional forms of supplication contrasts with the dignity and restraint that characterized his reign and leadership during the Trojan War. By approaching Achilles in this manner, Priam's image as a supplicant conveyed an observable lowering of status used to express vulnerability in traditional Greek visual depictions and narratives. As Tim McNiven has shown, such gestures of male supplication are also well known from Greek vase paintings.

Priam is killed during the Sack of Troy by Achilles' son Neoptolemus (also known as Pyrrhus). His death is graphically related in Book II of Virgil's Aeneid. In Virgil's description, Neoptolemus first kills Priam's son Polites in front of his father as he seeks sanctuary on the altar of Zeus. Priam rebukes Neoptolemus, throwing a spear at him, harmlessly hitting his shield. Neoptolemus then drags Priam to the altar and there kills him too. Priam's death is alternatively depicted in some Greek vases. In this version, Neoptolemus clubs Priam to death with the corpse of the latter's baby grandson, Astyanax.

== Gallery ==
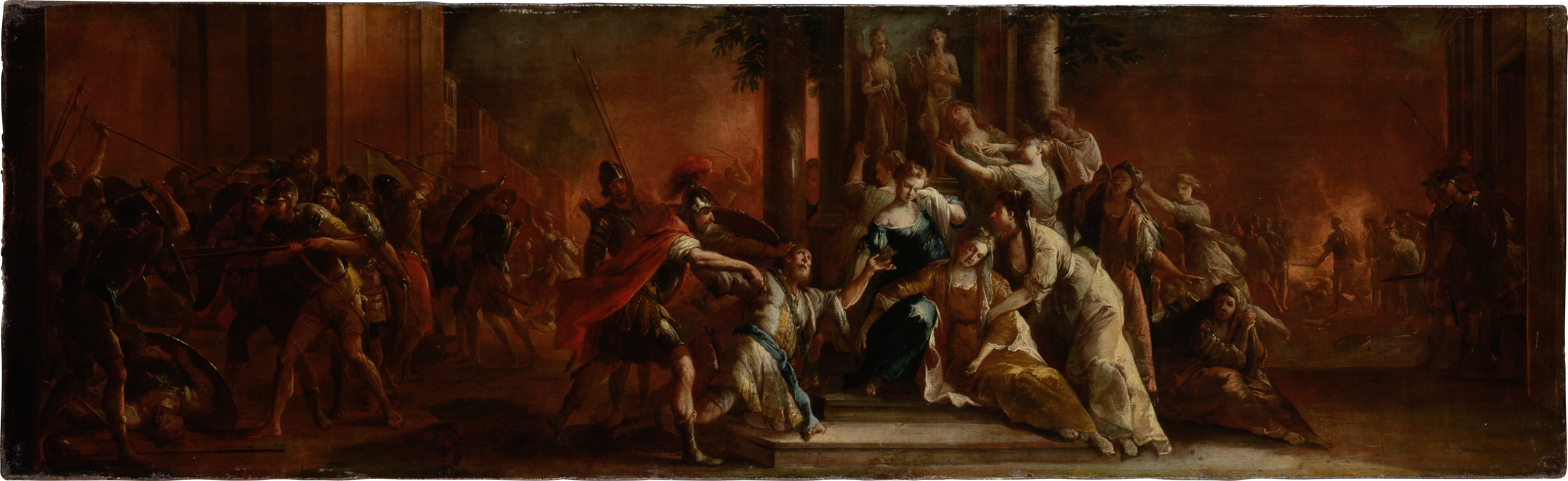
The Death of Priam by Johann Andreas Herrlein

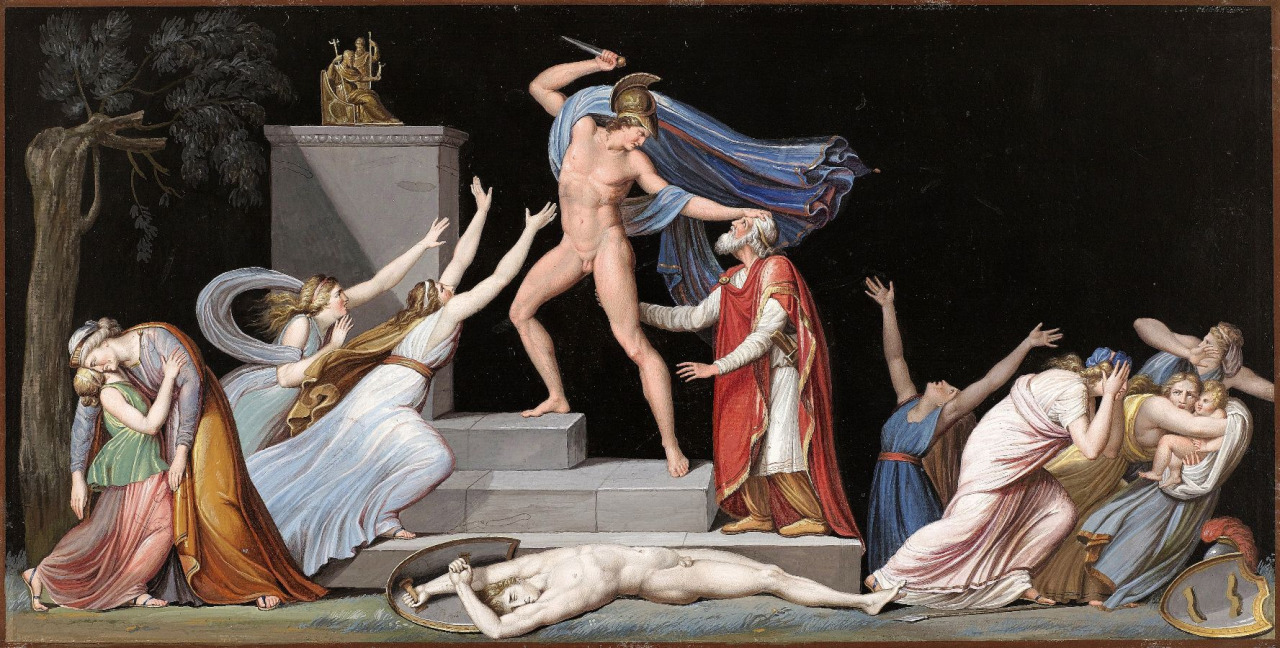
The Death of Priam by Vincenzo Camuccini

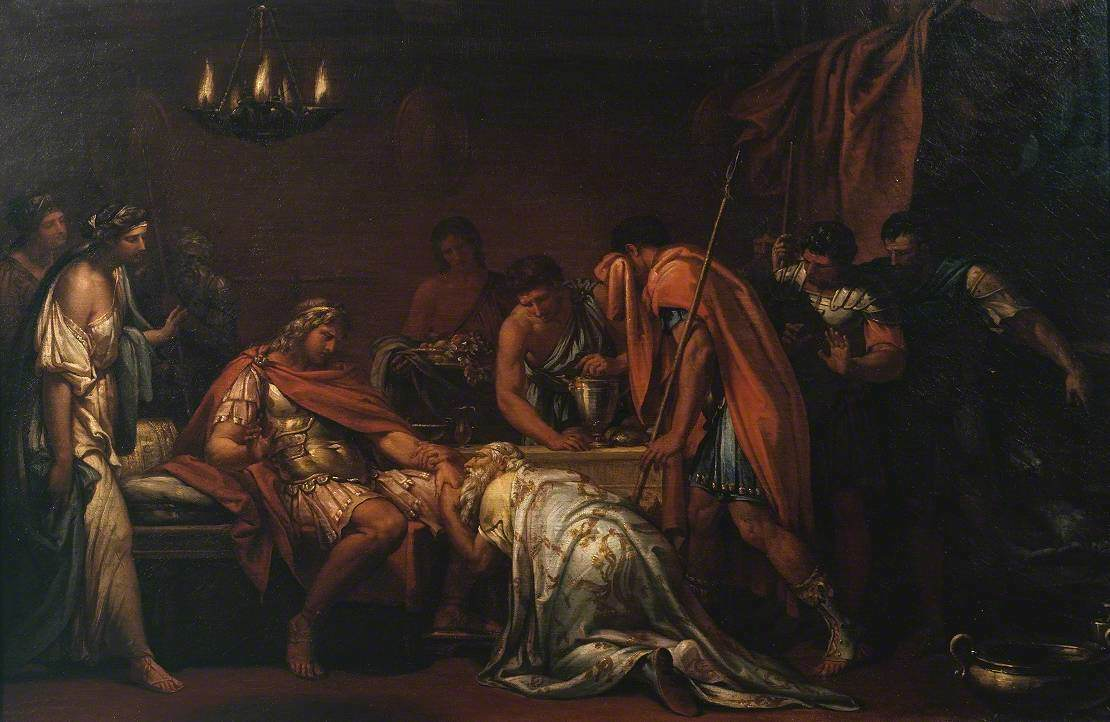
Priam Pleading with Achilles for the Body of Hector by Gavin Hamilton (1775)

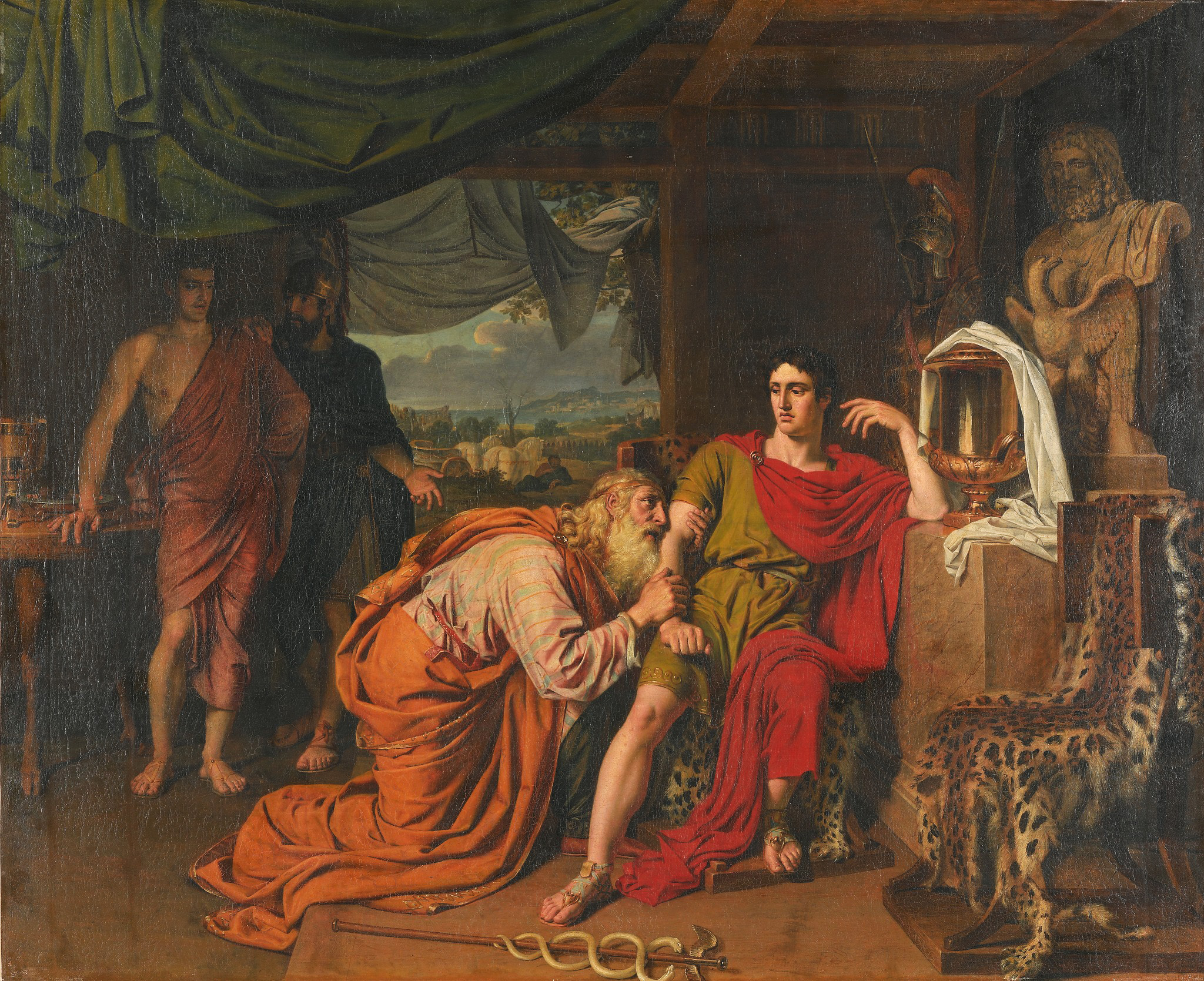
Priam asks Achilles to return Hector's body by Alexander Ivanov

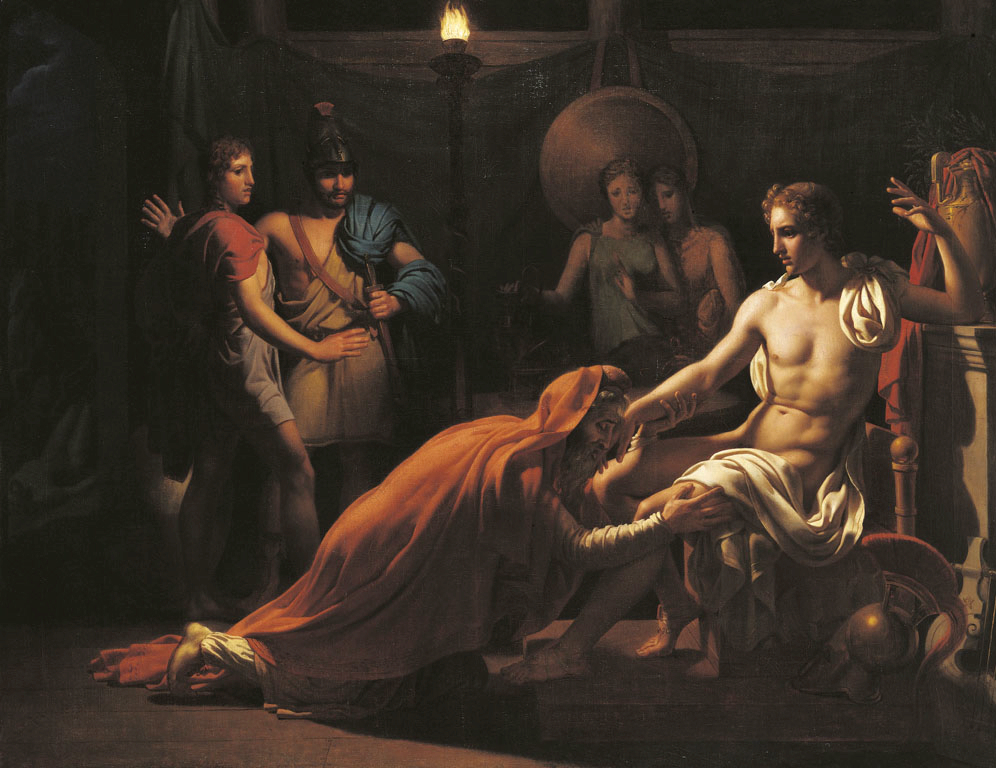
Priam at the feet of Achilles by Jérôme-Martin Langlois

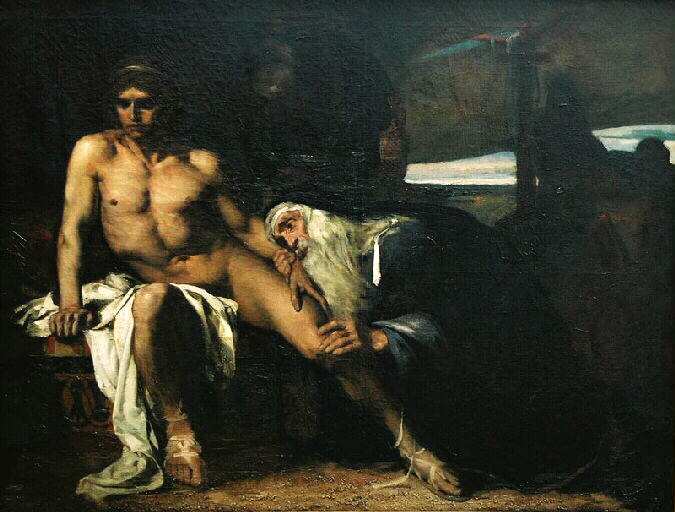
Priam at the feet of Achilles by Eugène Carrière (1876)

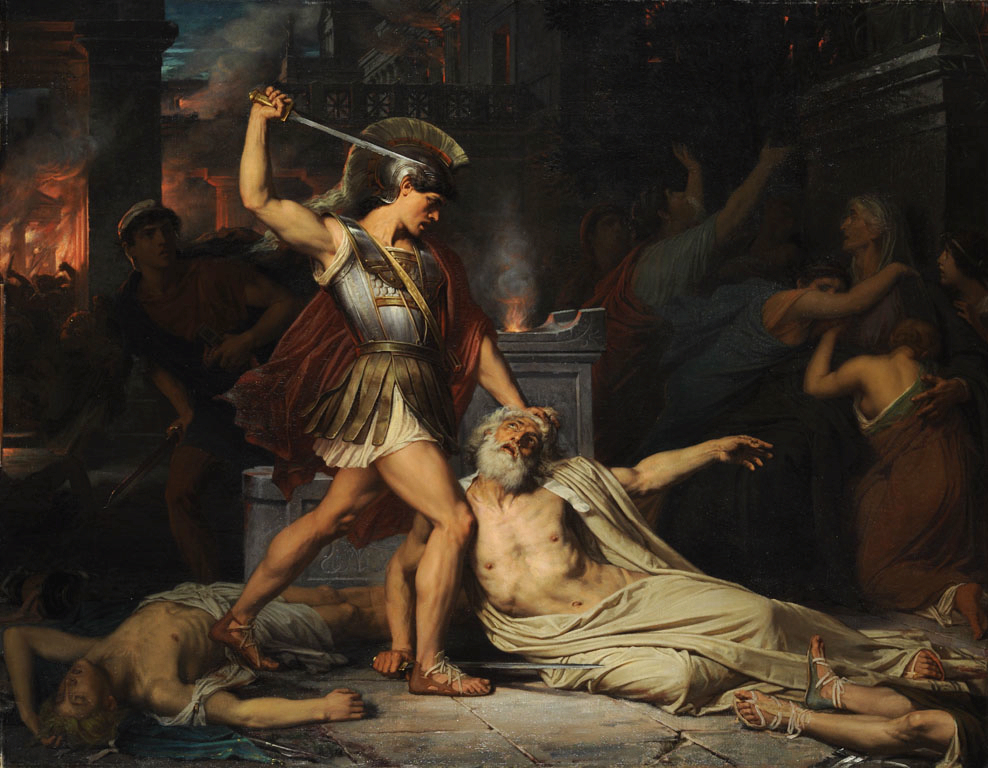
The Death of Priamos by Jules Lefebvre

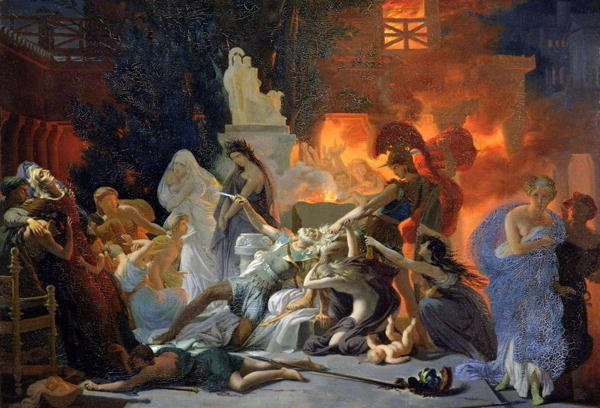
The Death of Priam by Pierre-Narcisse Guérin

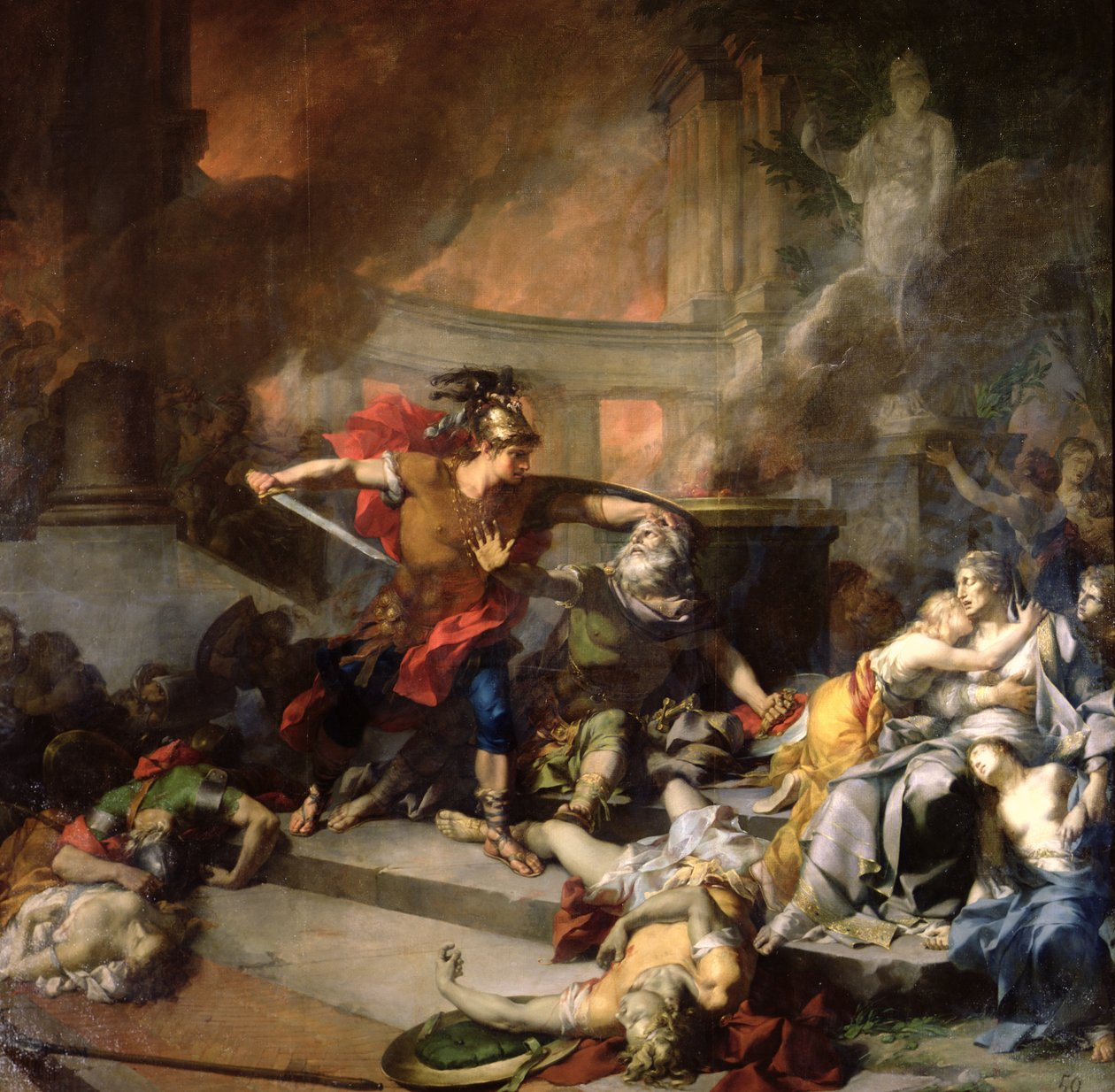
The Death of Priam by Jean-Baptiste Regnault

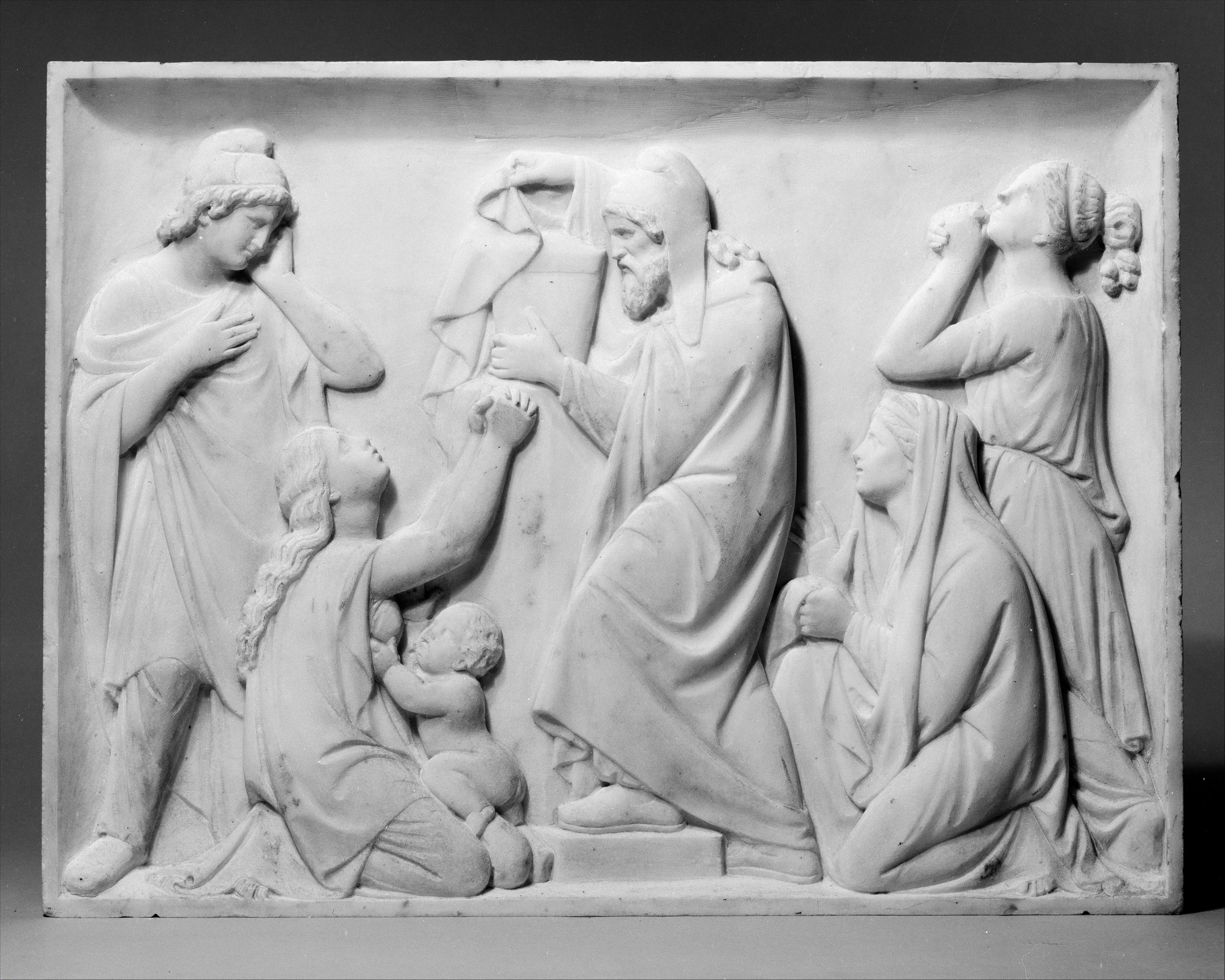
Priam holding the golden urn with the remains of Hector by Giovanni Maria Benzoni

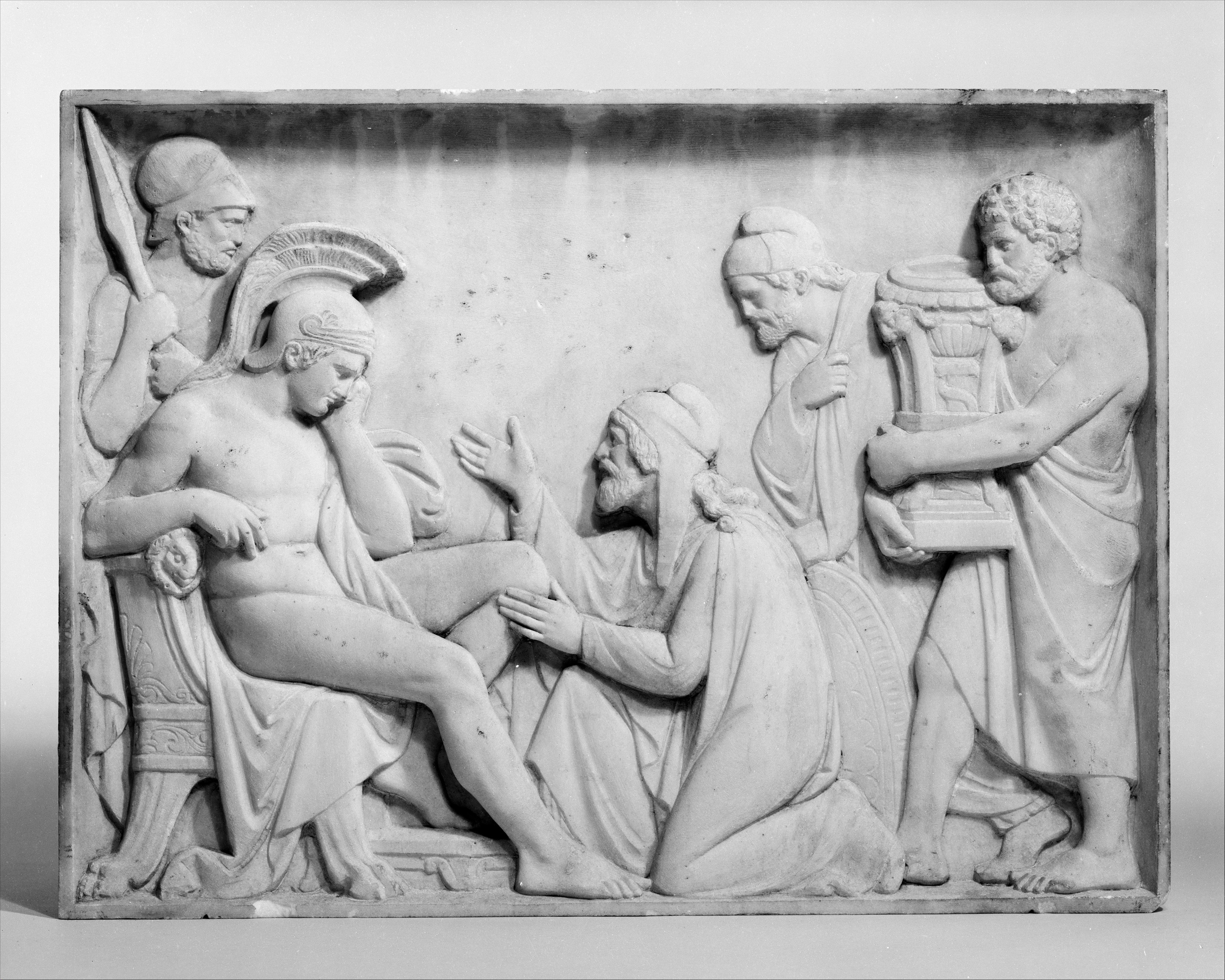
Priam Ransoming Hector's Body by Giovanni Maria Benzoni

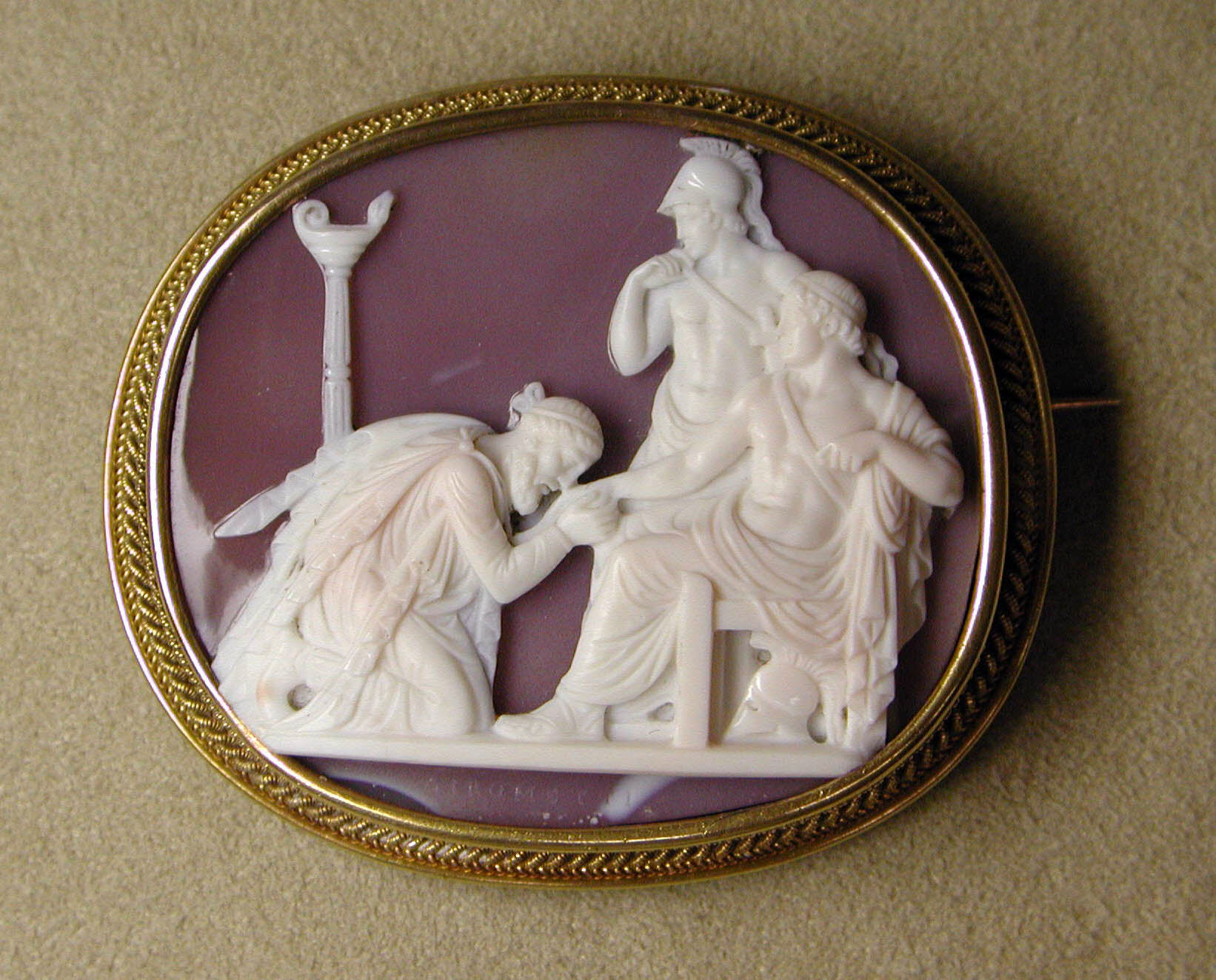
Priam Supplicating Achilles for the Body of Hector by Giuseppe Girometti

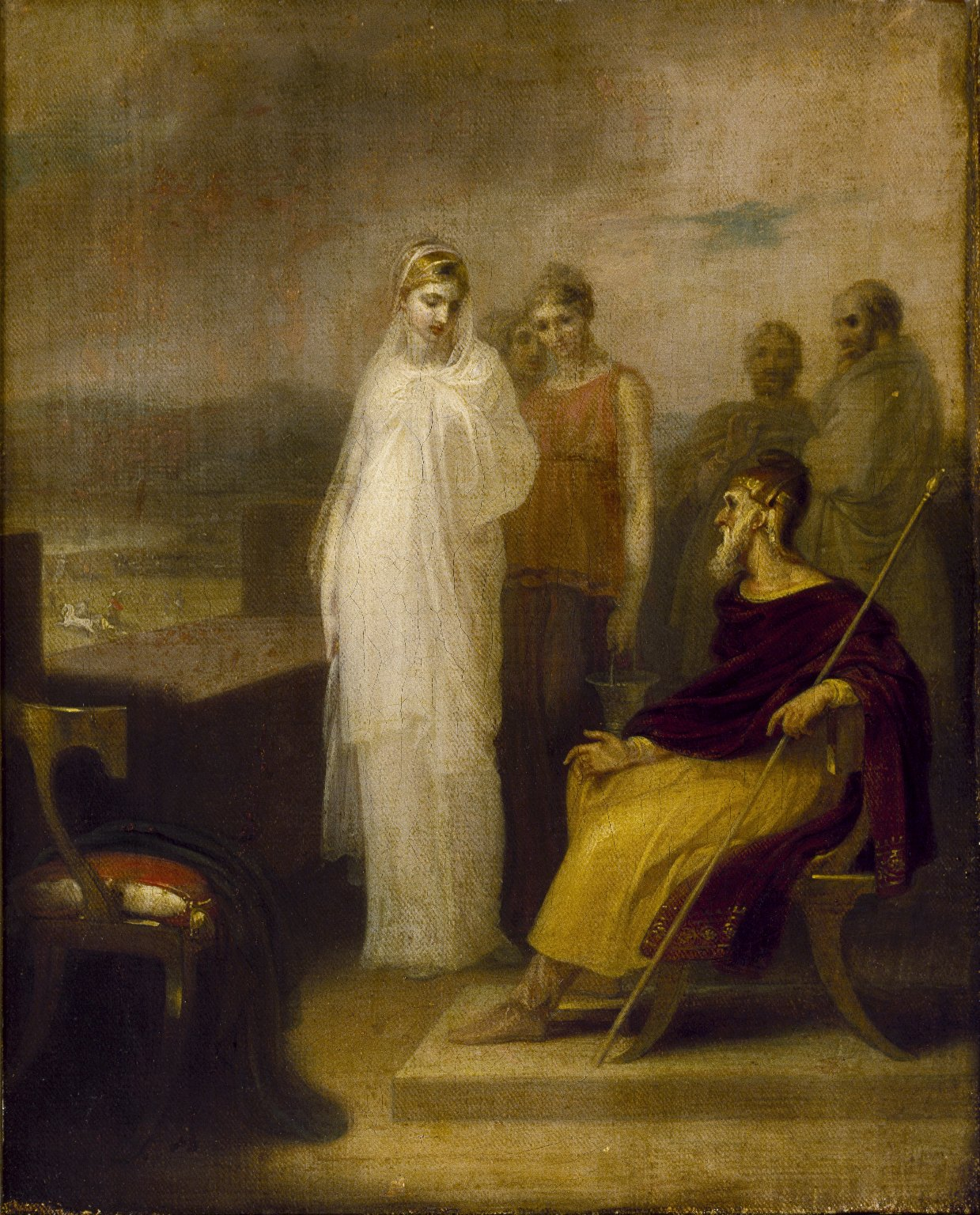
Helen and Priam at the Scaen Gate by Richard Cook

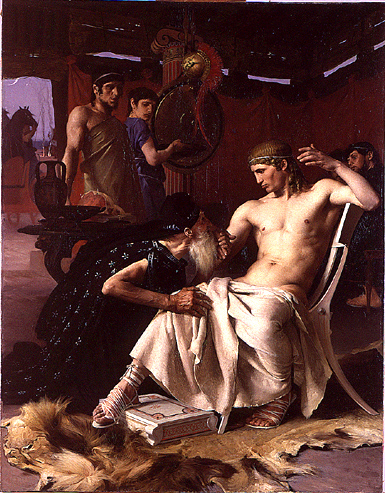
Priam at the feet of Achilles by Joseph Wencker

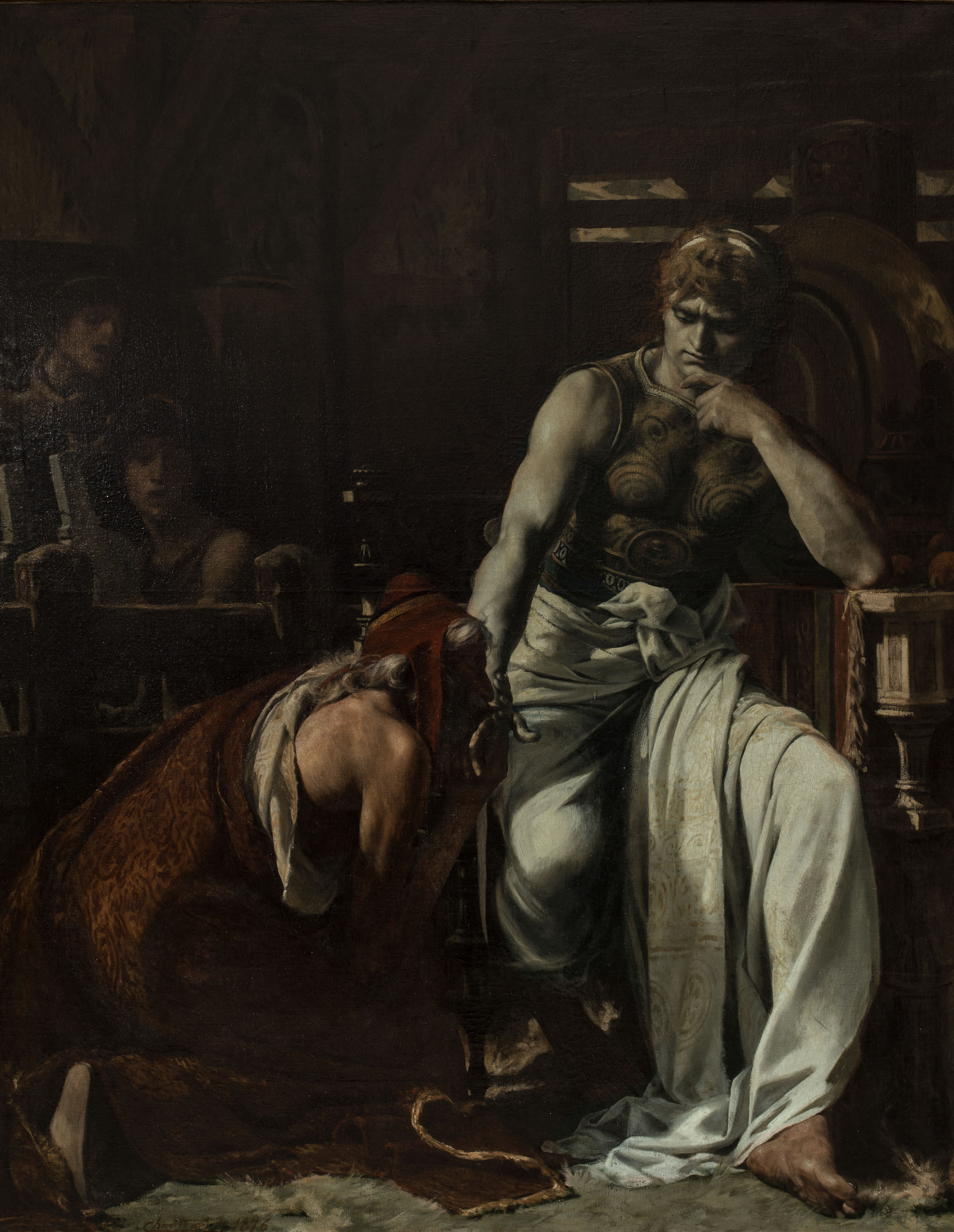
Priam demandant à Achille le corps d'Hector by Théobald Chartran

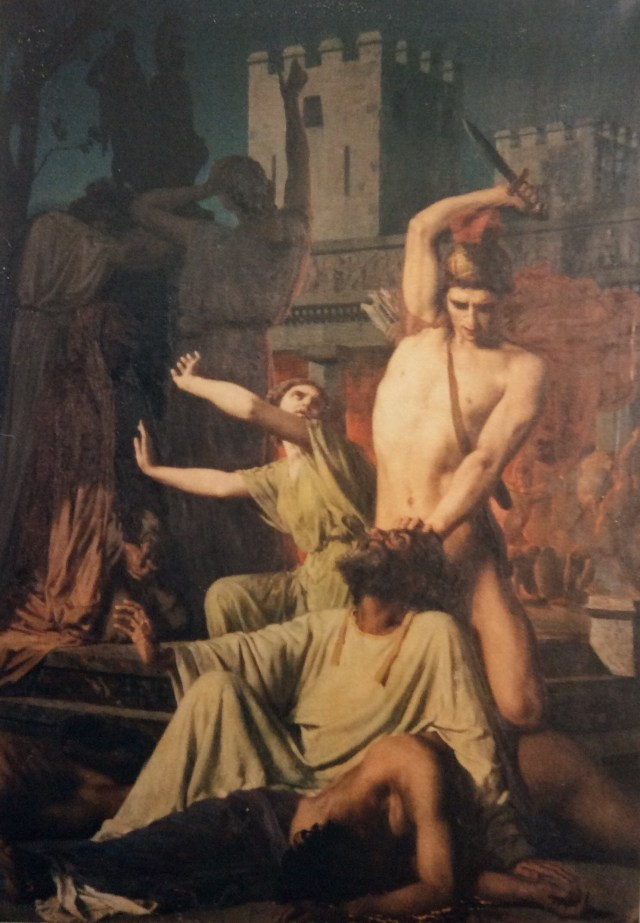
The Death of Priam by François-Marie Firmin-Girard (1861)

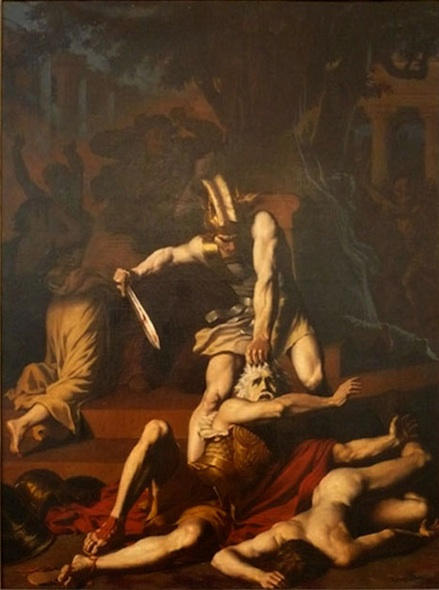
The Death of Priam by Alexandre-Louis Leloir (1861)

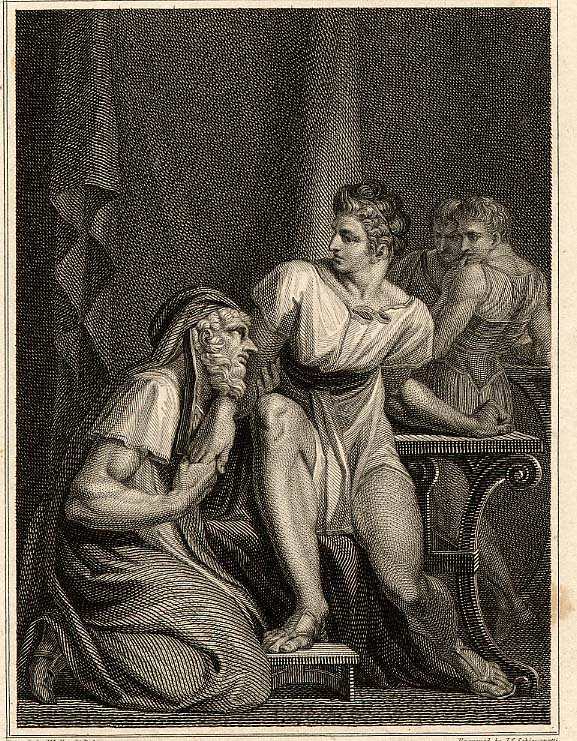
Priam Begs the Body of Hector by Henry Fuseli

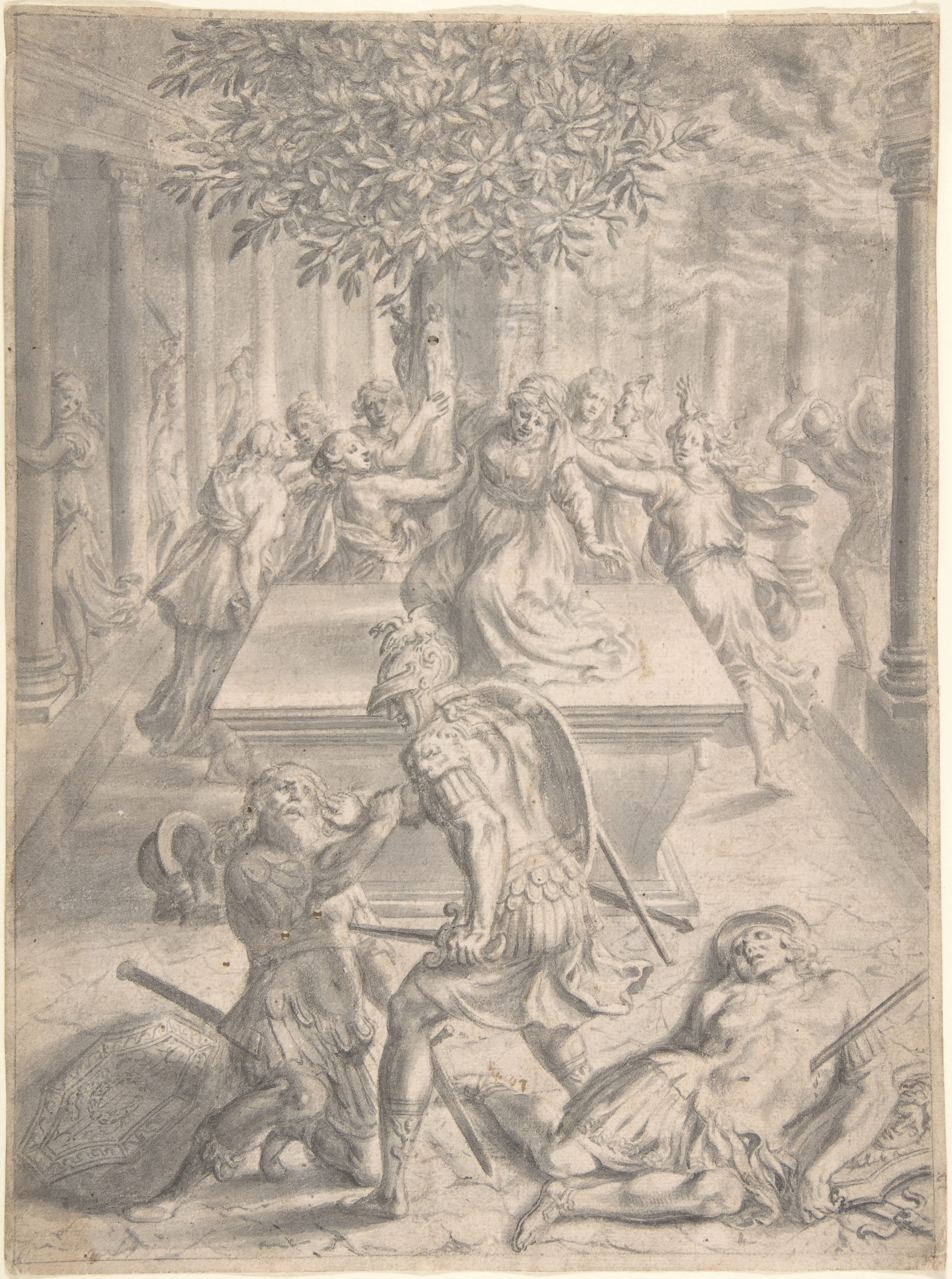
The Sack of Troy: Pyrrhus Killing Priam by Franz Cleyn

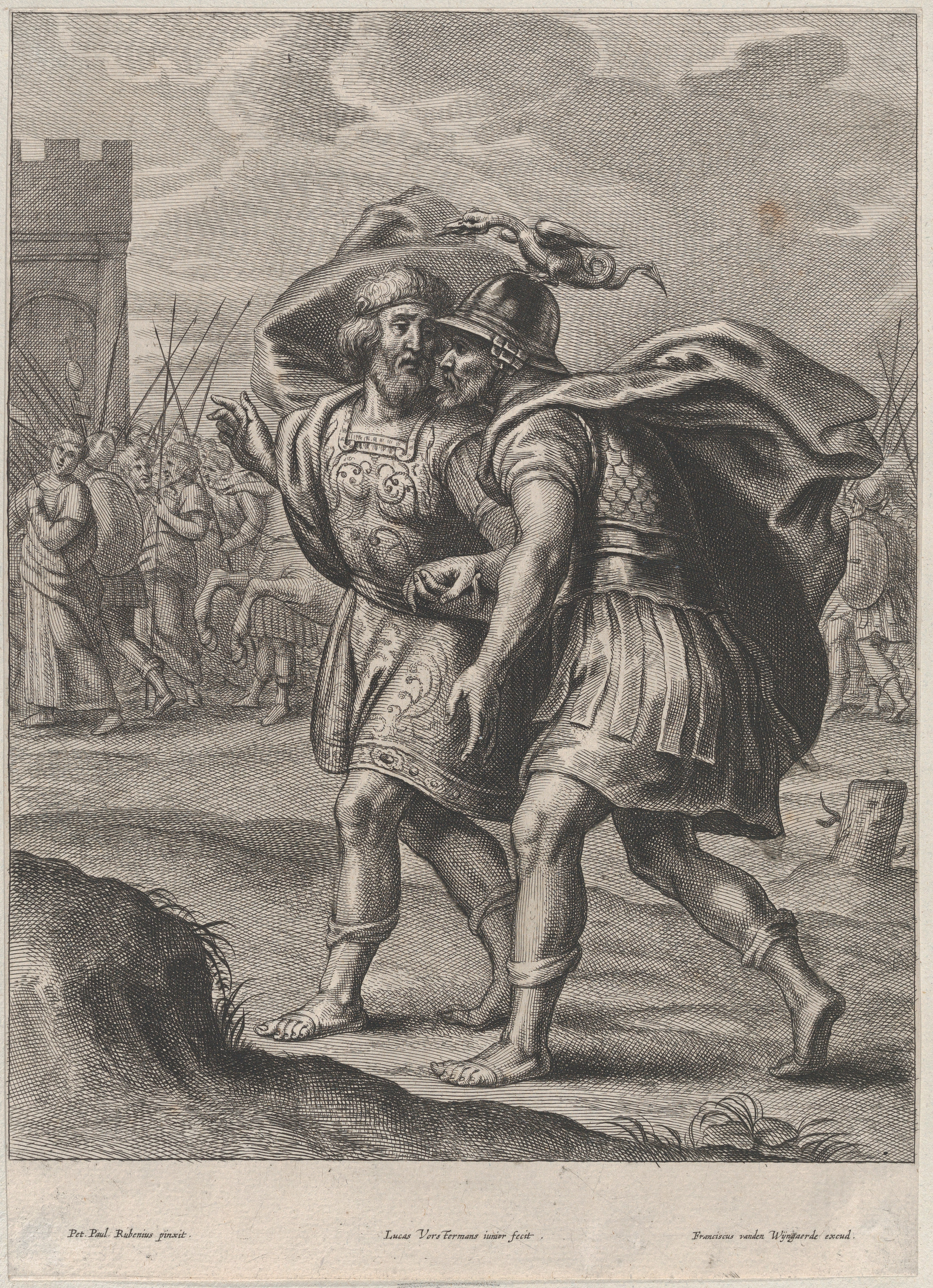
Achilles and Priam, in conversation outside of Troy by Lucas Vorsterman II

== Family tree ==
Trojan race

Oceanus	Tethys
Atlas	Pleione	Scamander	Idaea	Simoeis
Zeus/Jupiter	Electra	Teucer
Dardanus	Batea
Ilus	Erichthonius	Astyoche
Callirrhoe	Tros
Ilus	Ganymede	Assaracus	Hieromneme
Laomedon	Themiste	Capys
Priam	Anchises	Aphrodite/Venus	Latinus
Creusa	Aeneas	Lavinia
Ascanius	Silvius
Aeneas Silvius
Latinus Silvius
Alba
Atys
Capys
Capetus
Tiberinus Silvius
Agrippa
Romulus Silvius
Aventinus
Procas
Numitor	Amulius
Ares/Mars	Rhea Silvia/Ilia
Hersilia	Romulus	Remus

== Cultural depiction ==
=== Film ===
- Helen of Troy (1956) - played by Cedric Hardwicke.
- The Trojan Horse (1961) - played by Carlo Tamberlani.
- Troy (2004) - played by Peter O'Toole.

=== TV series ===
- Helen of Troy (2003) - played by John Rhys-Davies.
- Troy: Fall of a City (2018) - played by David Threlfall.

=== Theater ===
- Les Troyens in which King Priam plays a minor role (1863).
- King Priam (1962).

== See also ==
- Priam's Treasure
