= Calybe =

Two characters from Greek mythology

Calybe (Ancient Greek: Καλυβη, romanized: Kalybē, lit. 'rustic hut', 'cabin' or 'covering') may refer to the two distinct characters from Greek mythology:

- Calybe, a nymph who was a wife of the Trojan king Laomedon and the mother of Bucolion.
- Calybe, one of the follower of Dionysus in the Indian War.
