= Diochthondas =

Greek mythological figure

In Greek mythology, Diochthondas (Ancient Greek: Διοχθώνδας) was a Minyan prince as the son of King Minyas of Orchomenus probably either by Euryale, Clytodora, or Phanosyra, daughter of Paeon. His possible siblings were Clymene, Periclymene, Eteoclymene, Orchomenus, Presbon, Athamas, Elara, Persephone and the Minyades.
