= Scamandrus =

Town in ancient Mysia

Coordinates: 39°48′01″N 26°21′40″E

Scamandrus or Skamandros (Ancient Greek: Σκάμανδρος), was a small town in the ancient Troad in ancient Mysia, no doubt situated on the Scamander River in the plain of Troy.

Its site is located near Akköy Yakası, Asiatic Turkey.
