= Laomedon =

Greek mythological Trojan king

- King of Troy
- Member of the Trojan Royal Family
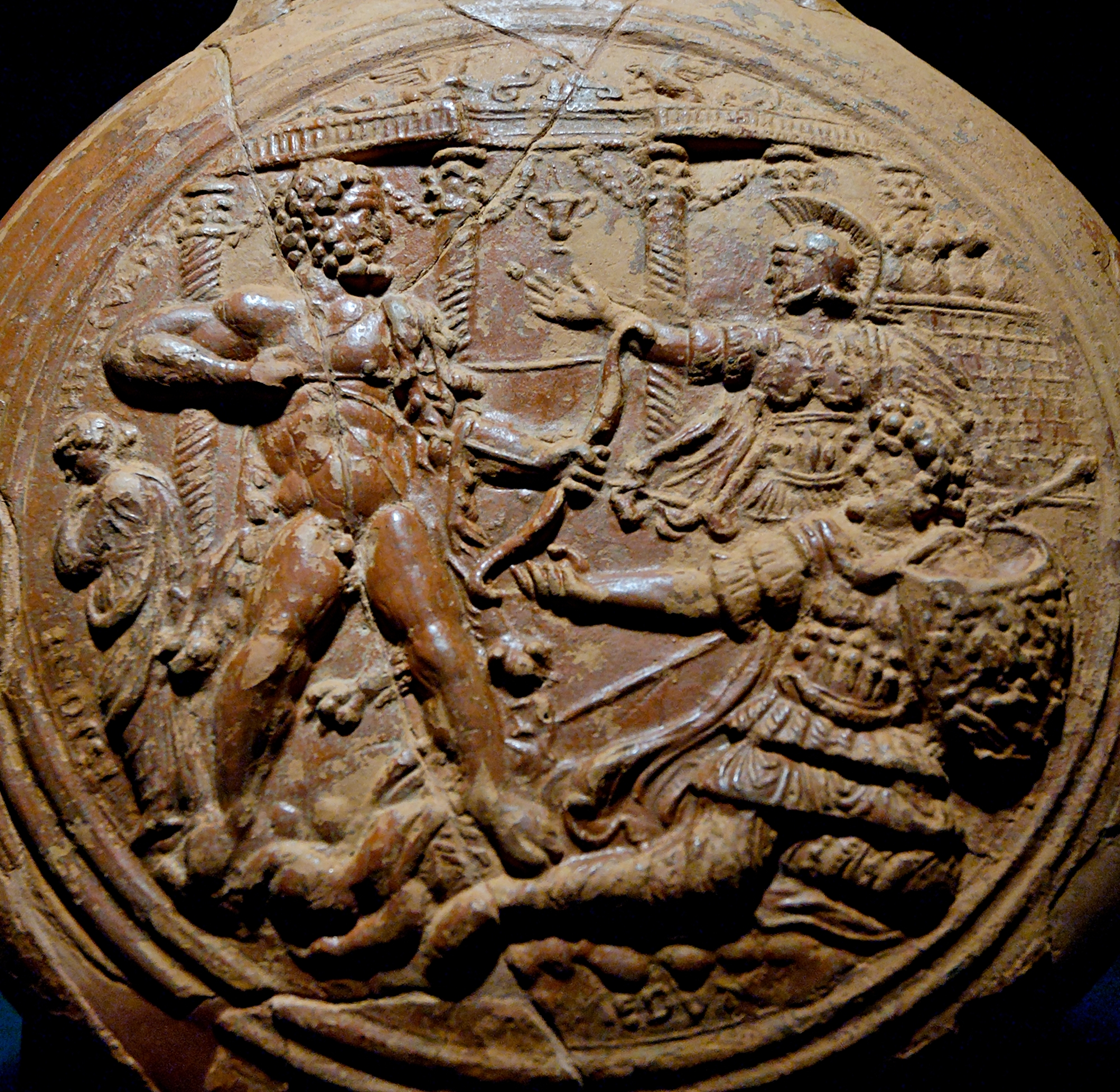
- Heracles about to kill Laomedon, terra sigillata flask from Southern Gaul, late 1st century–early 2nd century AD
- Predecessor: Ilus II
- Successor: Priam
- Abode: Troy

Genealogy
- Parents: Ilus II and Eurydice or Leucippe or Batea
- Siblings: Themiste (or Themis), Telecleia and Tithonus
- Consort: Placia or Strymo (or Rhoeo) or Zeuxippe or Leucippe (2) Calybe
- Children: Tithonus, Priam, Lampus, Hicetaon, Clytius, Hesione, Cilla, Astyoche, Proclia, Antigone, Aethilla, Medesicaste, Clytodora, Bucolion

In Greek mythology, Laomedon (/leɪˈɒmɪdɒn/; Ancient Greek: Λαομέδων, romanized: Lāomédōn, lit. 'ruler of the people' or 'lord of the people') was a Trojan king, son of Ilus and thus nephew of Ganymede and Assaracus.

Laomedon was variously identified with different parents and siblings, as well as numerous children, including Priam and Tithonus. His possible wives were Placia, Strymo, Zeuxippe, or Leucippe. Laomedon owned magical horses with divine parentage, a gift from Zeus to his grandfather Tros in compensation for kidnapping Tros's son Ganymede.

Zeus sent Poseidon and Apollo to serve Laomedon as punishment for a conspiracy against Zeus. The two gods built walls around Troy, but Laomedon refused to pay them, leading to a pestilence and a sea monster attacking the city. To end the calamities, Laomedon had to sacrifice his daughter Hesione to the sea monster. Heracles arrived and agreed to save Hesione in exchange for the magical horses, but Laomedon went back on his promise, causing Heracles to wage war on Troy.

Heracles eventually conquered the city, killing Laomedon and his sons, except for Podarces. Hesione was given to Telamon as a war prize, and she ransomed her brother Podarces, who then became known as Priam.

== Family ==
Laomedon's mother was variously identified as Eurydice, Leucippe or Batia. Thus, his possible siblings are Themiste, Telecleia and sometimes, even Tithonus.

He was the father of Priam, Lampus, Hicetaon, Clytius, Hesione, Cilla, Astyoche, Proclia, Aethilla, Medesicaste and Clytodora. Tithonus is also described by most sources as Laomedon's eldest legitimate son, and most sources omit Ganymede from the list of Laomedon's children, but indicate him as his uncle instead. Laomedon's possible wives were Placia, Strymo (or Rhoeo), Zeuxippe or Leucippe; by the former he begot Tithonus and by the latter King Priam («ὁ μὲν γὰρ Πρίαμος ἦν Λευκίππης, ὁ δὲ Τιθωνὸς Ῥοιοῦς ἢ Στρυμοῦς τῆς Σκαμάνδρου θυγατρὸς υἱός»: "Priamus was the son of Leucippe, whereas Tithonus was the son of Rhoeo or Strymo, the daughter of Scamander". He also had a son named Bucolion by the nymph Calybe, as recounted by Homer in the Iliad. Dictys Cretensis added Thymoetes to the list of Laomedon's children. Some variant manuscripts of Dares Phrygius name three more sons: Volcontus, Hypsipylus, and Amphitus, all of whom are killed in Heracles' sack of Troy.

Comparative table of Laomedon's family
| Relation | Names | Sources | | | | | | | | | | | | | | | |
|---|---|---|---|---|---|---|---|---|---|---|---|---|---|---|---|---|---|
| Relation | Names | Alcman | Homer | Sch. on | Hellanicus | Sch. on | Diodorus | Dionysius | Conon | Apollodorus | | Sch. on | Dictys | Hyginus | Tzeztes | | Dares |
| Relation | Names | Alcman | Homer | Hom. Ili. | Hellanicus | Eur. Hec. | Diodorus | Dionysius | Conon | Apollodorus | | Ap. Bib. | Dictys | Hyginus | Tzeztes | | Dares |
| Parents | Ilus | | ✓ | | | | ✓ | | | | | | | | | | |
| Parents | Ilus and Eurydice | | | ✓ | | | | | | ✓ | | ✓ | | | | | |
| Parents | Ilus and Leucippe | | | | | | | | | | | | | ✓ | | | |
| Parents | Ilus and Batia | | | ✓ | | | | | | | | ✓ | | | | | |
| Siblings | Telecleia | | | | | ✓ | | | | | | | | | | | |
| Siblings | Themiste | | | | | | | | | ✓ | | | | | | | |
| Siblings | Tithonus | | | | | | | | | | | | ✓ | | | | |
| Wife | Zeuxippe | ✓ | | ✓ | | | | | | | | | | | | | |
| Wife | Strymo | | | ✓ | ✓ | | | | | ✓ | | | | | ✓ | | |
| Wife | Placia | | | | | | | | | ✓ | | | | | | | |
| Wife | Leucippe | | | | | | | | | ✓ | | | | | | ✓ | |
| Wife | Rhoeo | | | | | | | | | | | | | | ✓ | | |
| Wife | Calybe | | | | | | | | | | ✓ | | | | | | |
| Children | Tithonus | | ✓ | ✓ | | | ✓ | | | ✓ | | | | | ✓ | | |
| Children | Priam or Podarces | | ✓ | | | | ✓ | | | ✓ | | | ✓ | | | ✓ | ✓ |
| Children | Clytius | | ✓ | | | | | | | ✓ | | | | | | | |
| Children | Hicetaon | | ✓ | | | | | | | ✓ | | | ✓ | | | | |
| Children | Lampus | | | | | | | | | ✓ | | | ✓ | | | | |
| Children | Thymoetes | | | | | | | | | | | | ✓ | | | | |
| Children | Aethilla | | | | | | | | ✓ | | | | | | | | |
| Children | Clytodora | | | | | | | ✓ | | | | | | | | | |
| Children | Hesione | | | | | | | | | ✓ | | | | | | | ✓ |
| Children | Cilla | | | | | | | | | ✓ | | | | | | | |
| Children | Astyoche | | | | | | | | | ✓ | | | | | | | |
| Children | Proclia | | | | | | | | | ✓ | | | | | | | |
| Children | Medesicaste | | | | | | | | | | | | | | ✓ | | |
| Children | Volcontus | | | | | | | | | | | | | | | | ✓ |
| Children | Hypsipylus | | | | | | | | | | | | | | | | ✓ |
| Children | Amphitus | | | | | | | | | | | | | | | | ✓ |
| Children | Bucolion | | | | | | | | | | ✓ | | ✓ | | | | |

== Mythology ==
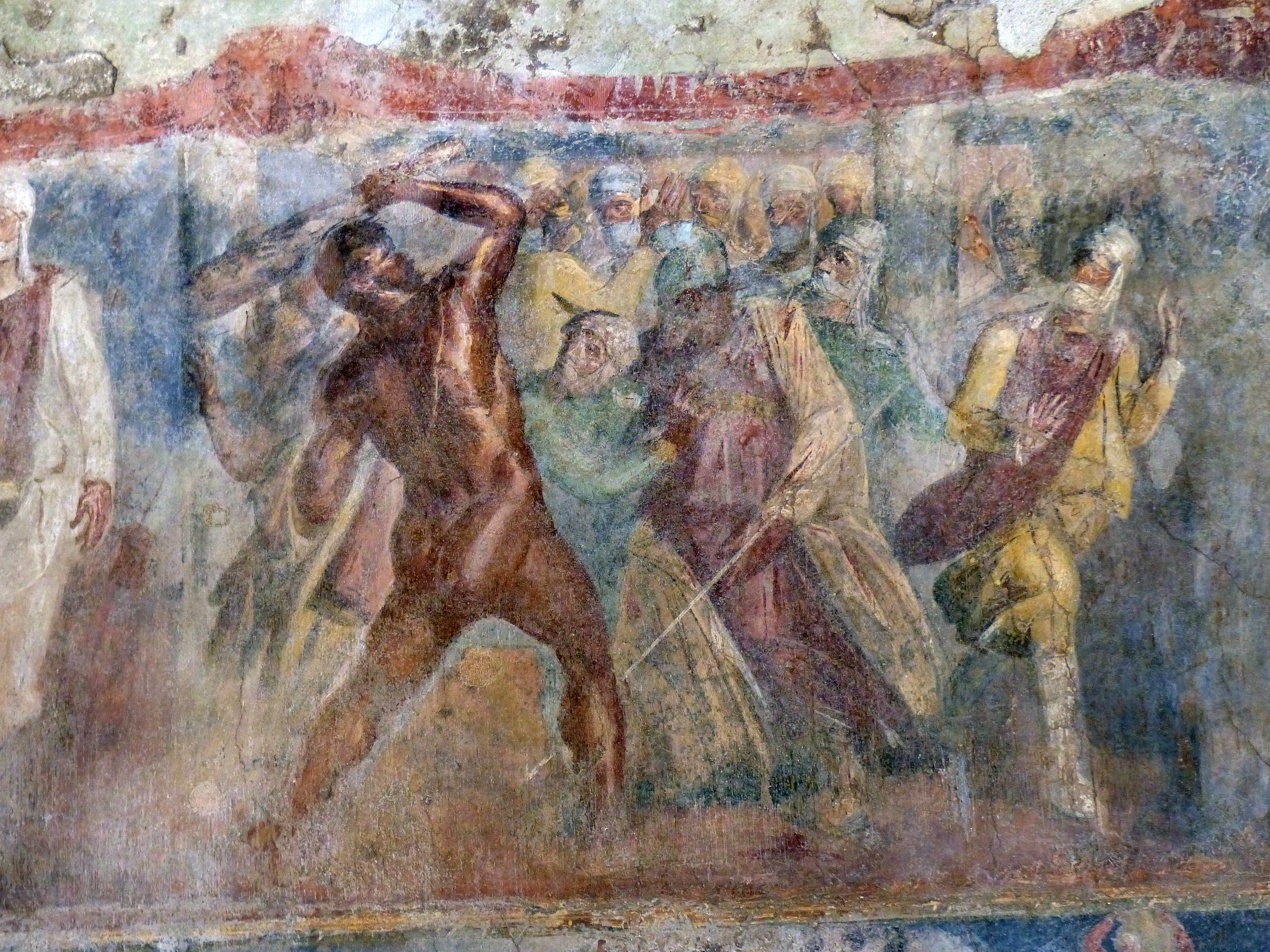
Heracles about to kill Laomedon, detail of fresco from the triclinium of the House of Octavius Quartio at Pompeii

=== Magical horses ===
Laomedon owned several horses with divine parentage that Zeus had given Tros (Laomedon's grandfather) as compensation for the kidnapping of Tros's son Ganymede. Anchises secretly bred his own mares from these horses.

According to one story, Ganymede was kidnapped by Zeus, who had seen the exceptional Virtue of the boy, as worthy only of Olympus, and ascended the young man into Heaven. Tros grieved for his son. Sympathetic, Zeus sent Hermes with two horses so swift they could run over water. Hermes also assured Tros that Ganymede was immortal and would be the cupbearer for the gods, a position of much distinction. Laomedon himself was the son of Ganymede's brother Ilus, the son of Tros.

=== Wrath of gods ===
When Poseidon and Apollo entered a conspiracy to put Zeus in bonds, the supreme god being offended, sent them to serve with King Laomedon as punishment for their nefarious design. In other sources, the two gods simply tested the wantonness of the Laomedon. As ordered by Laomedon who promised wages, the two deities assuming the likeness of men undertook to build huge walls around the city. But when they had finished, the king refused to fulfill their agreement of reward. In vengeance, before the Trojan War, Apollo sent a pestilence to Troy while Poseidon released a sea monster which, carried up by a flood, snatched away the people of the plain.

The oracles foretold deliverance from these calamities if Laomedon would expose his daughter Hesione to be devoured by the sea monster. The king then exposed her by fastening her to the rocks near the sea. But by chance, after fighting the Amazons, Heracles, who had landed at Troy, saw the girl to be sacrificed. The hero promised to save the princess on condition of receiving from Laomedon the mares which Zeus had given in compensation for the ascendance of Ganymede into Olympus to serve the Deities. When Laomedon agreed, Heracles (along with Oicles and Telamon) killed the monster and rescued Hesione at the last minute. But when Laomedon would not give up his magical horses for their deeds, the hero put to sea after threatening to make war on Troy.

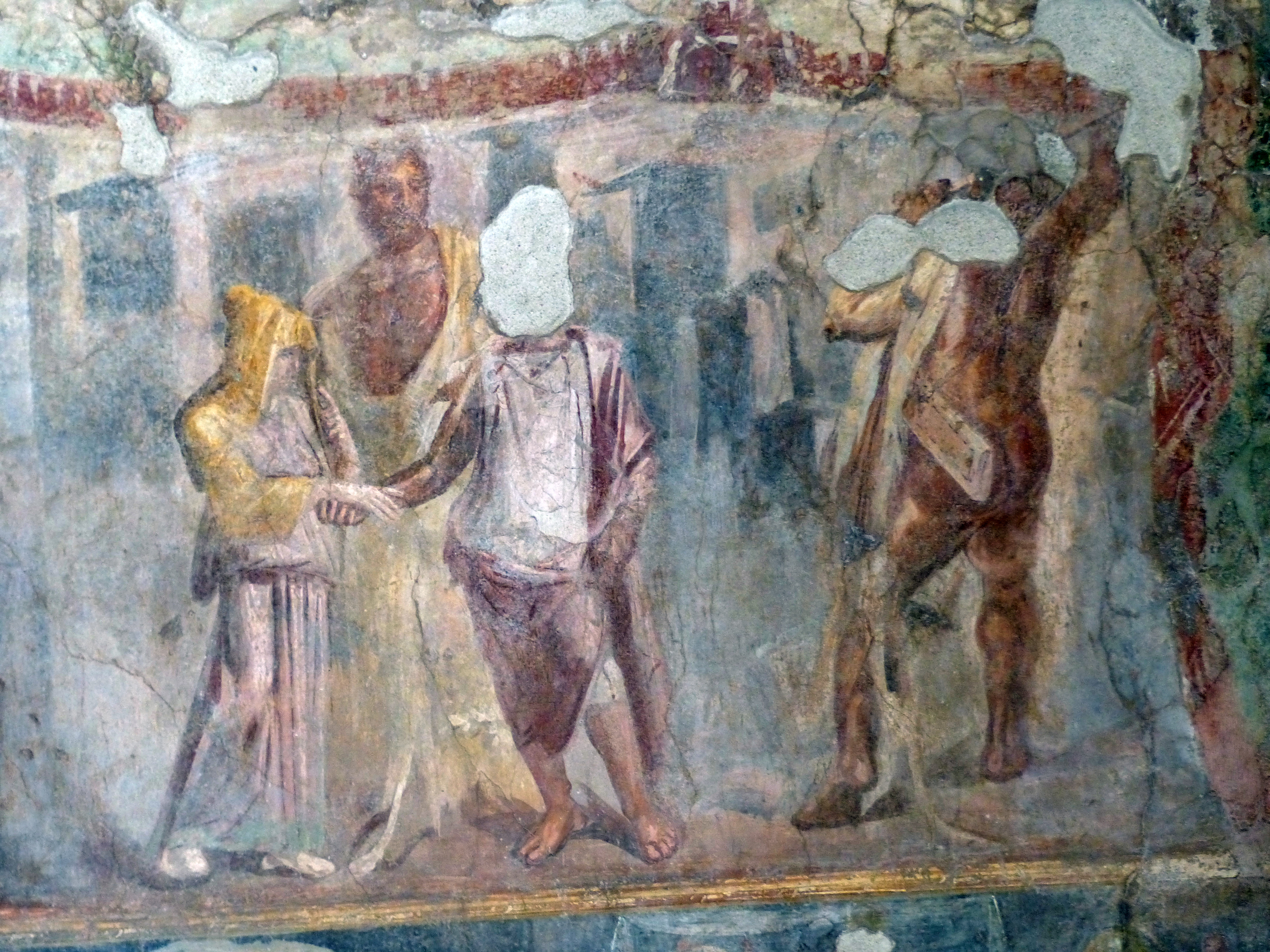
The marriage of Telamon and Hesione or Hesione's farewell to her brother Priam under the attention of Heracles and Telamon on the right, detail of fresco from the triclinium of the House of Octavius Quartio at Pompeii

=== Siege of Heracles ===
After his servitude, Heracles mustered an army of noble volunteers and sailed for Ilium with eighteen ships of fifty oars each. Having come to port at Ilium, he left the guard of the ships to Oicles and he, with the rest of the champions, set out to attack the city. Meanwhile, Laomedon marched against the ships with a multitude and slew Oicles in battle. But being repulsed by the troops of Heracles, Laomedon was besieged. The siege once laid, Telamon was the first to breach the wall and enter the city, and after him Heracles. When the son of Zeus had taken the city, he shot down Laomedon and his sons, except Podarces.

Heracles assigned Hesione as a war prize to Telamon (by whom Telamon had a son called Teucer) and allowed her to take with her whomsoever of the captives she would. When Hesione chose Podarces, Heracles said that her brother must first be a slave and then be ransomed by her. So, when the prince was being sold, Hesione took the golden veil from her head and gave it as a ransom; hence Podarces was thereafter called Priam (from priamai 'to buy').

== Genealogical tree ==
Trojan race

Oceanus | Tethys
Atlas | Pleione | Scamander | Idaea | Simoeis
Zeus/Jupiter | Electra | Teucer
Dardanus | Batea
Ilus | Erichthonius | Astyoche
Callirrhoe | Tros
Ilus | Ganymede | Assaracus | Hieromneme
Laomedon | Themiste | Capys
Priam | Anchises | Aphrodite/Venus | Latinus
Creusa | Aeneas | Lavinia
Ascanius | Silvius
Aeneas Silvius
Latinus Silvius
Alba
Atys
Capys
Capetus
Tiberinus Silvius
Agrippa
Romulus Silvius
Aventinus
Procas
Numitor | Amulius
Ares/Mars | Rhea Silvia/Ilia
Hersilia | Romulus | Remus

== Notes ==
Legendary titles
| Preceded by Ilus | King of Troy | Succeeded by Priam |
