= Rhoeo (mythology) =

In Greek mythology, Rhoeo (/ˈriːoʊ/; Ancient Greek: Ῥοιώ, romanized: Rhoiṓ) may refer to two distinct characters:

- Rhoeo, a Trojan naiad as the daughter of the river Scamander. She was the mother of Tithonus by King Laomedon of Troy. Rhoeo was usually called Strymo.
- Rhoeo, daughter of Staphylus and mother of Anius by Apollo.
