= Medesicaste =

In Greek mythology, the name Medesicaste (Ancient Greek: Μηδεσικάστη) refers to two women of the Trojan royal house:

- Medesicaste, a daughter of Laomedon and thus a sister of Priam. Together with her sisters Aethilla and Astyoche, she was taken captive by the Greeks after the end of the Trojan War; the three sisters set fire to the Greek ships, causing the crew to remain and settle at the place they were staying at (either Italy or Thrace).
- Medesicaste, an illegitimate daughter of Priam and wife of Imbrius.

== See also ==
- naming citation for Jovian asteroid 4715 Medesicaste
