= Idaea (mother of King Teucer) =

In Greek mythology, Idaea or Idaia (Ancient Greek: Ἰδαία means 'she who comes from Ida' or 'she who lives on Ida') was a nymph, presumably of Mount Ida in the ancient Troad region of western Anatolia (in modern-day Turkey). She was the wife of the river-god Scamander and a principal ancestor of the royal house of Troy.

According to Diodorus Siculus, and the mythographer Apollodorus, she was the mother, by Scamander, of Teucer, who was the first to rule as a king over the region known later as Troy. In addition to a son, Apollodorus goes on to mention two daughters of Scamander, presumably also by Idaea, Callirrhoe and Strymo. Callirrhoe became the wife of Tros, the eponymous hero of Troy and the Trojans while Strymo, later on, the wife of Laomedon the king of Troy, and father of Priam the king of Troy during the Trojan War.
