= Cilla (mythology) =

Cilla (Ancient Greek: Κίλλα) in Greek mythology is the name of two women associated with Troy:

- Cilla, a Trojan princess as the daughter of King Laomedon. Her mother was either Strymo, daughter of Scamander, or Placia, daughter of Otreus, or Leucippe.
- Cilla, sister of Hecuba. She was married to Thymoetes, brother of Priam. Secretly, she slept with Priam, resulting in her pregnancy. On the same day that Hecuba bore Paris to Priam, Cilla also gave birth to Munippus. On hearing of the oracle that stated that he must destroy she who had given birth and her child, Priam killed Cilla and her son to spare Hecuba and Paris. Perhaps as revenge for the death of Cilla, Thymoetes advised for the Trojans to take the wooden horse into the city.
