= Scamander =

Water deity in Greek mythology

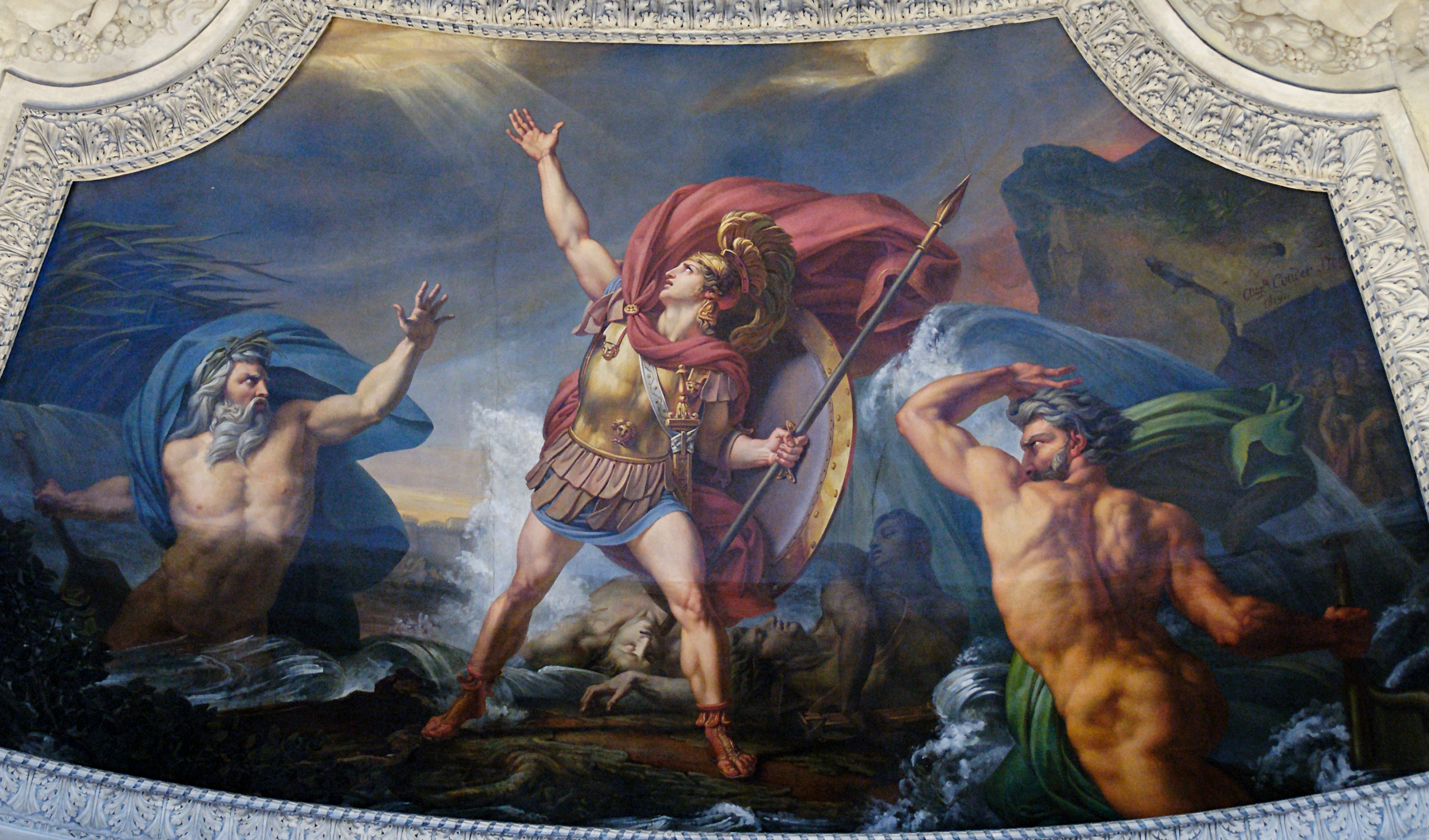
Water, or the Fight of Achilles against Scamander and Simoeis by Auguste Couder, 1819.

Scamander (/skəˈmændər/), also Skamandros (Ancient Greek: Σκάμανδρος) or Xanthos (Ξάνθος), was a river god in Greek mythology.

== Etymology ==
The meaning of this name is uncertain. The second element looks as though it is derived from Greek ἀνδρός (andrós), meaning "of a man", but there are sources who doubt this. The first element is more difficult to pinpoint; it could be derived from σκάζω (skázō), "to limp, to stumble (over an obstacle)", or from σκαιός (skaiós), meaning "left(-handed), awkward". The meaning of the name might then perhaps be "limping man" or "awkward man". This would refer to the many bends and winds (meanders) of the river, which does not run straight, but "limps" its way along.

== Geography ==
The Scamander River was named after the river god Scamander. The Scamander River was the river that surrounded Troy. The god Scamander took the side of the Trojans in the Trojan War.

== Family ==
According to Hesiod, Scamander is the son of the Titans Oceanus and Tethys. He is alternately described as a son of Zeus.

Scamander was the father of King Teucer whose mother was the water nymph Idaea. He was also mentioned as the father of Glaucia, lover of Deimachus. Additionally, Xanthus was credited to be the father of Eurythemista who bore Pelops and Niobe to Tantalus. Strymo or Rhoeo, wife of Laomedon, king of Troy was also called his daughter. Lastly, he also became the father of the priest Melus by an unknown woman or nymph.

== Mythology ==
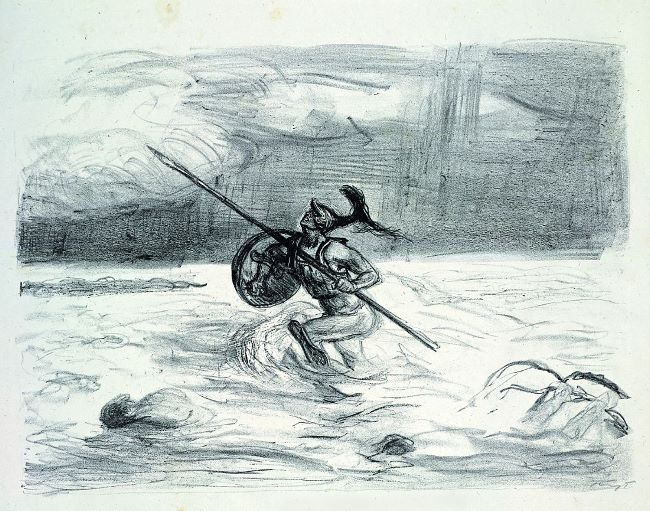
Achilles and Scamander

Scamander fought on the side of the Trojans during the Trojan War (Iliad XX, 73/74; XXI), after the Greek hero Achilles insulted him. Scamander was also said to have attempted to kill Achilles three times, and the hero was only saved due to the intervention of Hera, Athena and Hephaestus. In this context, he is the personification of the Scamander River that flowed from Mount Ida across the plain beneath the city of Troy, joining the Hellespont north of the city. The Achaeans, according to Homer, had set up their camp near its mouth, and their battles with the Trojans were fought on the plain of Scamander. In Iliad XXII (149ff), Homer states that the river had two springs: one produced warm water; the other yielded cold water, regardless of the season.

According to Homer, he was called Xanthos by gods and Scamander by men, which might indicate that the former name refers to the god and the latter one to the river itself.

In a story by Pseudo-Plutarch, Scamander went mad during the mysteries of Rhea and flung himself into the river Xanthus, which was then renamed to Scamander.

== Trojan descendants ==
Trojan race

Oceanus	Tethys
Atlas	Pleione	Scamander	Idaea	Simoeis
Zeus/Jupiter	Electra	Teucer
Dardanus	Batea
Ilus	Erichthonius	Astyoche
Callirrhoe	Tros
Ilus	Ganymede	Assaracus	Hieromneme
Laomedon	Themiste	Capys
Priam	Anchises	Aphrodite/Venus	Latinus
Creusa	Aeneas	Lavinia
Ascanius	Silvius
Aeneas Silvius
Latinus Silvius
Alba
Atys
Capys
Capetus
Tiberinus Silvius
Agrippa
Romulus Silvius
Aventinus
Procas
Numitor	Amulius
Ares/Mars	Rhea Silvia/Ilia
Hersilia	Romulus	Remus

== See also ==
- Karamenderes River
