= Karamenderes River =

River in the Republic of Turkey

Coordinates: 40°00′14″N 26°13′25″E

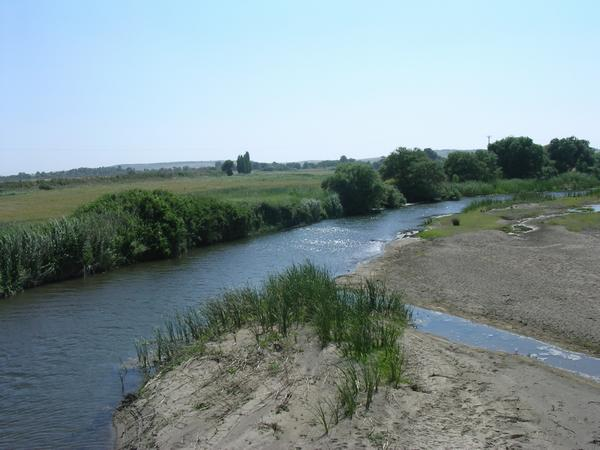
Scamander River

Karamenderes is a river located entirely within the Çanakkale Province of Turkey. It flows west from Mount Ida and empties into the Aegean Sea near the Troy Historical National Park. According to the Iliad, the battles of the Trojan War were fought in the lower courses of Karamenderes.

Known in antiquity as Scamander, Scamandrus or Skamandros (Ancient Greek: Σκάμανδρος), it was according to Homer called Xanthus or Xanthos (Ξάνθος) by the gods and Scamander by men; though it probably owed the name Xanthus to the yellow or brownish colour of its water. Notwithstanding this distinct declaration of the poet that the two names belonged to the same river, Pliny the Elder mentions the Xanthus and Scamander as two distinct rivers, and describes the former as flowing into the Portus Achaeorum, after having joined the Simoeis.

Pseudo-Plutarch (ca. 300 CE) tells us that Scamander went mad during the mysteries of Rhea and flung himself into the river Xanthus, which was then renamed to Scamander. He also says that an herb "like a vetch" grows in the river which bears a seed pod that rattles when ripe, and whoever possesses this plant "fears no apparition nor the sight of any God."

In regard to the colour of the water, it was believed to have even the power of dyeing the wool of sheep which drank of it. Homer states that the river had two sources close to the city of Troy, one sending forth hot water and the other cold, and that near these springs the Trojan women used to wash their clothes. Strabo remarks that in his time no hot spring existed in those districts; he further asserts that the river had only one source; that this was far away from Troy in Mount Ida; and lastly that the notion of its rising near Troy arose from the circumstance of its flowing for some time under ground and reappearing in the neighbourhood of Ilion. Homer describes the Scamander as a large and deep river, and states that the Simoeis flowed into the Scamander, which after the junction still retained the name of Scamander. Although Homer describes the river as large and deep, Herodotus states that its waters were not sufficient to afford drink to the army of Xerxes I.

The Scamander after being joined by the Simoeis has still a course of about 20 stadia eastward, before it reaches the sea, on the east of Cape Sigeum. Ptolemy, and apparently Pomponius Mela, assign to each river its own mouth, the Simoeis discharging itself into the sea at a point north of the mouth of the Scamander. To account for these discrepancies, it must be assumed that even at that time the physical changes in the aspect of the country arising from the muddy deposits of the Scamander had produced these effects, or else that Ptolemy mistook a canal for the Scamander. Even in the time of Strabo the Scamander reached the sea only at those seasons when it was swollen by rains, and at other times it was lost in marshes and sand. It was from this circumstance, that, even before its junction with the Simoeis, a canal was dug, which flowed in a western direction into the sea, south of Sigeum, so that the two rivers joined each other only at times when their waters were high. Pliny, who calls the Scamander a navigable river, is in all probability thinking of the same canal. The point at which the two rivers reach the sea is now greatly changed, for owing to the deposits at the mouth, the coast has made great advances into the sea, and the Portus Achaeorum, probably a considerable bay, has altogether disappeared.
