= Ilus =

Characters in Greek mythology

In Greek mythology, Ilus (/ˈiːloʊs/; Ancient Greek: Ἶλος, romanized: Îlos) is the name of several mythological characters associated directly or indirectly with Troy:

- Ilus, the son of Dardanus, and the legendary founder of Dardania.
- Ilus, the son of Tros, and the legendary founder of Troy.
- Ilus, son of Mermerus, and grandson of Jason and Medea. This Ilus lived at Ephyra, between Elis and Olympia. In a tale recounted in the Odyssey, he played host to Odysseus, but when Odysseus requested from Ilus poison for his arrows, he declined, from fear of divine vengeance.
- Ilus, an ally of Turnus, the man who opposed Aeneas in Italy.
