= Astyoche =

Name of various characters in Greek mythology

The name Astyoche (/əˈstaɪəkiː/; Ancient Greek: Ἀστυόχη, lit. 'possessor of the city' or 'town-possessing') or Astyocheia (/ˌæstioʊˈkiːə/; Ἀστυόχεια) was attributed to the following individuals in Greek mythology:

- Astyoche, naiad daughter of the river god Simoeis, mother of Tros by Erichthonius.
- Astyoche, a Trojan princess, the daughter of King Laomedon by Strymo, Placia or Leucippe, sister of Priam, wife of Telephus and mother of Eurypylus (some call her daughter of Priam and wife of Eurypylus). She was bribed by Priam with a gold vine to persuade Eurypylus to go to the Trojan War, which resulted in his being killed in the battle (cf. the story of Eriphyle). Together with Aethilla and Medesicaste, she was taken captive after the sack of Troy and set fire to the Greek ships during their stay on the Italian coast.
- Astyoche, a Minyan princess, the daughter of King Actor of Orchomenus, son of Azeus. She was the mother of Ascalaphus and Ialmenus with Ares. The latter lay with her in secret when the maiden entered into her upper chamber.
- Astyoche, sister of Agamemnon and Menelaus. She married Strophius, and became the mother of Pylades. She is also known as Anaxibia or Cydragora.
- Astyoche, a daughter of King Phylas of Ephyra, mother of Tlepolemus by Heracles. Also known as Astydameia or Astygeneia.
- Astyoche, wife of Phylacus, mother of Protesilaus and Podarces. These two are otherwise known as grandsons of Phylacus through Iphiclus.
- Astyoche, one of the Niobids.
- Astyoche, mother of Pentheus, otherwise known as Agave.
- Astyoche, daughter of Itylus and possible mother of Ajax the Lesser.
- Astyoche, mother of Euryalus by Mecisteus.
