= Lampus =

Various characters in Greek mythology

In Greek mythology, Lampus or Lampos (Ancient Greek: Λάμπος), a Greek verb meaning "glitter" or "shine", may refer to:

Human

- Lampus, a son of Aegyptus, who married and was killed by the Danaid Ocypete.
- Lampus, an elder of Troy, one of the sons of King Laomedon and Strymo, father of Dolops.
- Lampus, one of the fifty Thebans who laid an ambush against Tydeus and were killed by Apollo.

Canine (dog)

- Lampus, one of Actaeon's dogs

Equine (horse)

- Lampus, one of the two horses that drove the chariot of Eos, the other one being Phaethon
- Lampus, one of the four horses of Helios, alongside Erythreus, Acteon and Philogeus.
- Lampus, one of the four horses of Hector, alongside Aethon, Xanthus and Podarges
- Lampus, one of the mares of Diomedes

== Other uses ==
Lampos is used as a surname of many families in Greece. Otherwise:

- Lampus is also the name of a Macedonian horse breeder and Olympic victor, whose statue Pausanias describes in his Description of Greece.
- Lampos is also the fictitious name of a sacred site in the parish of Rennes-les-Bains (Aude), France, given by the priest Henri Boudet in his work La Vraie Langue Celtique (1886).
