= Ilus (son of Dardanus) =

In Greek mythology, Ilus (/ˈiːloʊs/; Ancient Greek: Ἶλος, romanized: Ilos, Ancient Greek pronunciation: [ˈiːlos]) was a king of Dardania.

== Family ==
Ilus was the eldest son of Dardanus either by Batea of Troad, daughter of Teucer, or probably Olizone, daughter of Phineus. Ilus was the brother of Erichthonius, his successor. In some accounts, the names of the two sons of Dardanus and Batea were Erichthonius and Zacynthus.

== Mythology ==
After Dardanus died, his heir Ilus succeeded him to the throne. However, after his long reign, he died childless and heirless. His brother Erichthonius consequently gained the kingship, and became the ancestor of the later Trojans. Homer's Iliad mentions at several points the tomb of Ilus in the middle of the Trojan plain.

== Family tree ==
Trojan race

Oceanus	Tethys
Atlas	Pleione	Scamander	Idaea	Simoeis
Zeus/Jupiter	Electra	Teucer
Dardanus	Batea
Ilus	Erichthonius	Astyoche
Callirrhoe	Tros
Ilus	Ganymede	Assaracus	Hieromneme
Laomedon	Themiste	Capys
Priam	Anchises	Aphrodite/Venus	Latinus
Creusa	Aeneas	Lavinia
Ascanius	Silvius
Aeneas Silvius
Latinus Silvius
Alba
Atys
Capys
Capetus
Tiberinus Silvius
Agrippa
Romulus Silvius
Aventinus
Procas
Numitor	Amulius
Ares/Mars	Rhea Silvia/Ilia
Hersilia	Romulus	Remus
