= Themiste =

Daughter of Ilus

In Greek mythology, Themiste (Ancient Greek: Θεμίστη, romanized: Themístē, lit. 'law', 'custom' or 'that which is laid down or established') or Themis was a Trojan princess and daughter of King Ilus II of Troad. She was the (half) sister of Laomedon, Tithonius and Telecleia. Themiste was married off by Ilus to her cousin King Capys, son of Assaracus and Hieromneme, and became the queen of Dardania. With him she became the mother of Anchises and possibly, Acoetes. The former son would later become the father of the famous Aeneas while the later one, became the father of the priest Laocoon.

== Family tree ==
Trojan race

Oceanus	Tethys
Atlas	Pleione	Scamander	Idaea	Simoeis
Zeus/Jupiter	Electra	Teucer
Dardanus	Batea
Ilus	Erichthonius	Astyoche
Callirrhoe	Tros
Ilus	Ganymede	Assaracus	Hieromneme
Laomedon	Themiste	Capys
Priam	Anchises	Aphrodite/Venus	Latinus
Creusa	Aeneas	Lavinia
Ascanius	Silvius
Aeneas Silvius
Latinus Silvius
Alba
Atys
Capys
Capetus
Tiberinus Silvius
Agrippa
Romulus Silvius
Aventinus
Procas
Numitor	Amulius
Ares/Mars	Rhea Silvia/Ilia
Hersilia	Romulus	Remus
