= King Teucer =

Greek mythological figure

Teucer
- Eponymous king of Teucria
- Successor: Dardanus
- Abode: Crete or Attica, later Teucria (Troad)

Genealogy
- Parents: Scamander and Idaea
- Siblings: Callirhoe
- Children: Batea or Arisbe

In Greek mythology, King Teucer (or Teukros) (/ˈt(j)uːsər/; Ancient Greek: Τεῦκρος Teûkros) was said to have been the son of the river-god Scamander and the nymph Idaea.

== Mythology ==
Before the arrival of Dardanus, the land that would eventually be called Dardania (and later still the Troad) was known as Teucria and the inhabitants as Teucrians, after Teucer.

According to Virgil, Teucer was originally from Crete but left the island during a great famine with a third of its inhabitants. They settled near the Scamander river, named after Teucer's father, not far from the Rhaetean promontory. However, Dionysius of Halicarnassus states that Teucer had come to the Troad from Attica where he was a chief of the Xypetȇ region. In both cases he ended up in the region which would be known as the Troad.

Apollodorus and Diodorus Siculus, however, do not mention Teucer as having relocated. Instead, they name him as son of Xanthus, the god of the river Scamander local to Troy.

His company was said to have been greatly annoyed by a vast number of mice during their first night in the region. Teucer had previously been directed by an oracle before leaving Crete to build a settlement in the place where he should be attacked in the night-time by an enemy sprung from the earth or "where the earth-born should attack them"; since mice had attacked them during the night he resolved to settle there. He probably founded the city of Hamaxitus and established it as his capital. Teucer is said to have had a felicitous reign as he was successful in all of his undertakings. He was said to have been the first to build a temple to Apollo Sminthius or Apollo the "destroyer of mice" since Apollo was said to have destroyed mice infesting that area during Teucer's reign.

Batea (also known as Batia or Arisba), King Teucer's daughter and only child, was given in marriage to Dardanus. She is sometimes equated with the Amazon queen Myrina. In Lycophron's Alexandra, Dardanus was said to wed Arisba from "Crete's royal house". Dardanus received land on Mount Ida from his father-in-law when Teucer died since he did not have a biological son. There, he founded the city of Dardanus. Alternatively, Teucer gave Dardanus half of his kingdom while he was still alive. After Teucer's death, all of his lands were incorporated into that of Dardanus. The entire region came to be known as Dardania.

In later times, the people of Troy were sometimes referred to as "Teucrians". For example, in the Aeneid, Aeneas is called the "great captain of the Teucrians". In most myths mentioning King Teucer, he is described as being a distant ancestor of the Trojans. Diodorus states that Teucer was "the first to rule as king over the land of Troy" while in the Aeneid, Anchises recalls him being the Trojans' "first forefather". This suggests that King Teucer was considered the first figure to bear the bloodline of the Trojans as his father Scamander did not have such acclamations.

Some academics suggest a connection between Teucris in old Greek texts and Tjeker in old Egyptian texts.

== Family tree ==
Trojan race

Oceanus	Tethys
Atlas	Pleione	Scamander	Idaea	Simoeis
Zeus/Jupiter	Electra	Teucer
Dardanus	Batea
Ilus	Erichthonius	Astyoche
Callirrhoe	Tros
Ilus	Ganymede	Assaracus	Hieromneme
Laomedon	Themiste	Capys
Priam	Anchises	Aphrodite/Venus	Latinus
Creusa	Aeneas	Lavinia
Ascanius	Silvius
Aeneas Silvius
Latinus Silvius
Alba
Atys
Capys
Capetus
Tiberinus Silvius
Agrippa
Romulus Silvius
Aventinus
Procas
Numitor	Amulius
Ares/Mars	Rhea Silvia/Ilia
Hersilia	Romulus	Remus

== See also ==
- Teucer
- Tjeker
