= Batea of Troad =

Batea
- Teucrian princess
- Other names: Arisbe; Myrina
- Abode: Teucria (Troad)

Genealogy
- Parents: Teucer or Tros
- Siblings: -
- Consort: Dardanus
- Children: Erichthonius, Ilus, Zacynthus, and (possibly) Idaea

In Greek mythology, the name Batea or Bateia (/bəˈtiːə/ bə-TEE-ə; Ancient Greek: Βάτεια) was the daughter or (less commonly) the aunt of King Teucer. She was the mother of Ilus, Erichthonius, and Zacynthus. A hill in the Troad and the town Bateia were named after her.

== Mythology ==
Batia's father was the ruler of a tribe known as the Teucrians (Teucri). The Teucrians inhabited the area of northwest Asia Minor later called the Troad (Troas). She married King Dardanus, son of Zeus and Electra, whom Teucer named as his heir. By Dardanus, Batea was the mother of Ilus, Erichthonius, and Zacynthus.

In some accounts, Arisbe of Crete, a daughter of Teucer, is mentioned as the wife of Dardanus. Arisbe and Batea are usually assumed to be the same person. According to another version of the myth, Batia was the daughter of Tros, instead of Teucer.

Batea gave her name to a hill in the Troad, mentioned in the Iliad, as well as to the town of Bateia.

She is sometimes equated with the Amazon queen Myrina.

== Trojan family tree ==
Trojan race

Oceanus	Tethys
Atlas	Pleione	Scamander	Idaea	Simoeis
Zeus/Jupiter	Electra	Teucer
Dardanus	Batea
Ilus	Erichthonius	Astyoche
Callirrhoe	Tros
Ilus	Ganymede	Assaracus	Hieromneme
Laomedon	Themiste	Capys
Priam	Anchises	Aphrodite/Venus	Latinus
Creusa	Aeneas	Lavinia
Ascanius	Silvius
Aeneas Silvius
Latinus Silvius
Alba
Atys
Capys
Capetus
Tiberinus Silvius
Agrippa
Romulus Silvius
Aventinus
Procas
Numitor	Amulius
Ares/Mars	Rhea Silvia/Ilia
Hersilia	Romulus	Remus
