= Tros (mythology) =

Ruler of Troy in Greek mythology

- Eponym of Troad
- Member of the Dardanian Royal Family
- Predecessor: Erichthonius or Ilus I
- Successor: Ilus II
- Abode: Troy

Genealogy
- Parents: (1) Erichthonius and Astyoche or (2) Ilus I
- Consort: Callirhoe or Acallaris
- Children: Ilus II, Assaracus, Ganymede, Cleopatra and Cleomestra

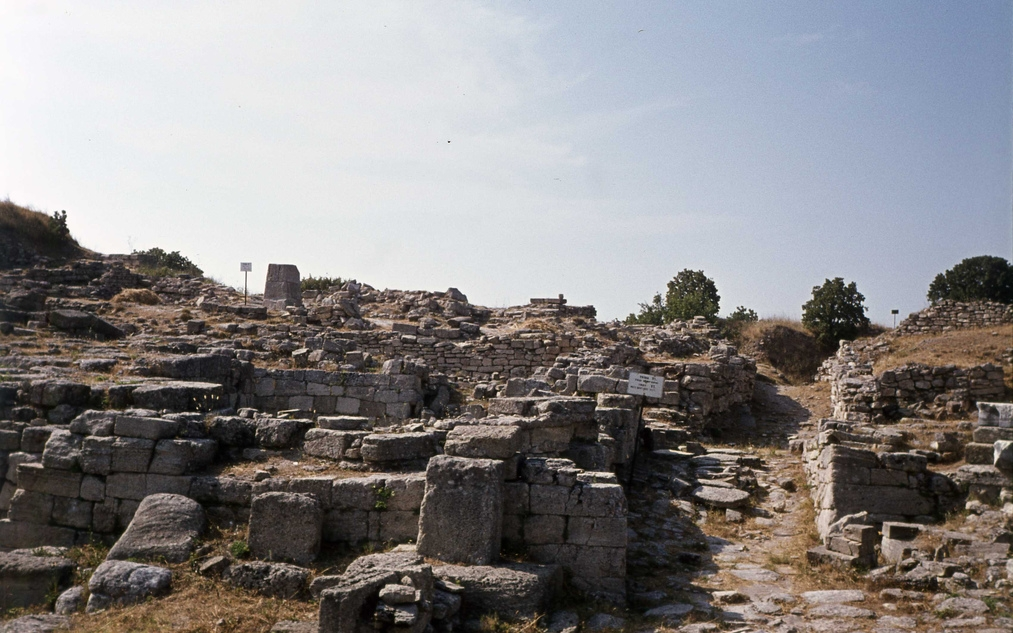
Troy

In Greek mythology, Tros (/ˈtrɒs/; Ancient Greek: Τρώς, romanized: Trōs, Ancient Greek: [trɔ́ːs]) was the founder of the kingdom of Troy, of which the city of Ilios, founded by his son Ilus took the same name, and the son of Erichthonius by Astyoche (daughter of the river god Simoeis) or of Ilus I, from whom he inherited the throne. Tros was the father of three sons: Ilus, Assaracus and Ganymede and two daughters, Cleopatra and Cleomestra. He is the eponym of Troy, also named Ilion for his son Ilus. Tros's wife was said to be Callirrhoe, daughter of the river god Scamander, or Acallaris, daughter of Eumedes.

Another Tros was a Trojan warrior. According to Homer's Iliad, he is the son of the Lycian Alastor and he was slain by Achilles.

== Genealogy ==
=== Homer's account ===
The following excerpts from Homer's Iliad recount Tros's ancestors and descendants:

Howbeit, if thou wilt, hear this also, that thou mayest know well my lineage, and many there be that know it: at the first Zeus, the cloud-gatherer, begat Dardanus, and he founded Dardania, for not yet was sacred Ilios builded in the plain to be a city of mortal men, but they still dwelt upon the slopes of many-fountained Ida. And Dardanus in turn begat a son, king Erichthonius, who became richest of mortal men. Three thousand steeds had he that pastured in the marsh-land; mares were they. rejoicing in their tender foals. Of these as they grazed the North Wind became enamoured, and he likened himself to a dark-maned stallion and covered them; and they conceived, and bare twelve fillies These, when they bounded over the earth, the giver of grain, would course over the topmost ears of ripened corn and break them not, and whenso they bounded over the broad back of the sea, would course over the topmost breakers of the hoary brine. And Erichthonius begat Tros to be king among the Trojans, and from Tros again three peerless sons were born, Ilus, and Assaracus, and godlike Ganymedes that was born the fairest of mortal men; wherefore the gods caught him up on high to be cupbearer to Zeus by reason of his beauty, that he might dwell with the immortals. And Ilus again begat a son, peerless Laomedon, and Laomedon begat Tithonus and Priam and Clytius, and Hicetaon, scion of Ares. And Assaracus begat Capys, and he Anchises; but Anchises begat me and Priam goodly Hector. This then is the lineage amid the blood wherefrom I avow me sprung.

=== Apollodorus' account ===
The ancient author Apollodorus in his book, Bibliotheca, also gives Tros' lineage:

And he (i.e. Dardanus) had sons born to him, Ilus and Erichthonius, of whom Ilus died childless, and Erichthonius succeeded to the kingdom and marrying Astyoche, daughter of Simoeis, begat Tros. On succeeding to the kingdom, Tros called the country Troy after himself, and marrying Callirrhoe, daughter of Scamander, he begat a daughter Cleopatra, and sons, Ilus, Assaracus, and Ganymede. This Ganymede, for the sake of his beauty, Zeus caught up on an eagle and appointed him cupbearer of the gods in heaven; and Assaracus had by his wife Hieromneme, daughter of Simoeis, a son Capys; and Capys had by his wife Themiste, daughter of Ilus, a son Anchises, whom Aphrodite met in love's dalliance, and to whom she bore Aeneas and Lyrus, who died childless.

=== Dionysius of Halicarnassus ===
Another writer, named Dionysius of Halicarnassus, wrote a passage about Tros' ancestry that gives us back to Dardanus proving that the Trojan race was indeed of Greek origin.

But the subject requires that I relate also how Aeneas was descended: this, too, I shall do briefly. Dardanus, after the death of Chrysê, the daughter of Pallas, by whom he had his first sons, married Bateia, the daughter of Teucer, and by her had Erichthonius, who is said to have been the most fortunate of all men, since he inherited both the kingdom of his father and that of his maternal grandfather. Of Erichthonius and Callirrhoê, the daughter of Scamander, was born Tros, from whom the nation has received its name; of Tros and Acallaris, the daughter of Eumedes, Assaracus; of Assaracus and Clytodora, the daughter of Laomedon, Capys; of Capys and a Naiad nymph, Hieromnemê, Anchises; of Anchises and Aphroditê, Aeneas.

== Mythology ==
When Zeus abducted Ganymedes, Tros grieved for his son. Sympathetic, Zeus sent Hermes with a pair of fine horses so swift they could run "over water and standing ears of grain", "the same that carry the immortals". Hermes also assured Tros that Ganymede was immortal and would be the cupbearer of the gods, a position of great distinction.

In Homer's Iliad, Book V, 265 the described the horses given by Zeus to Tros as a compensation for his abduction of the youth:

As for these twain, their swift horses shall not bear both back from us again, even if one or the other escape. And another thing will I tell thee, and do thou lay it to heart. If so be Athene, rich in counsel, shall vouchsafe me this glory, to slay them both, then do thou hold here these swift horses, binding the reins taut to the chariot rim; but be mindful to rush upon the horses of Aeneas and drive them forth from the Trojans to the host of the well-greaved Achaeans. For they are of that stock where from Zeus, whose voice is borne afar, gave to Tros recompense for his son Ganymedes, for that they were the best of all horses that are beneath the dawn and the sun. Of this stock the king of men Anchises stole a breed, putting his mares to them while Laomedon knew naught thereof. And from these a stock of six was born him in his palace; four he kept himself and reared at the stall, and the other two he gave to Aeneas, devisers of rout. Could we but take these twain, we should win us goodly renown.

In variant versions, Ganymede is son of Laomedon son of Ilus son of Tros; however, others call him son of Ilus, Erichthonius or Assaracus.

It was from Tros that the Dardanians were called Trojans and the land named the Troad.

== Family tree ==
Trojan race

Oceanus	Tethys
Atlas	Pleione	Scamander	Idaea	Simoeis
Zeus/Jupiter	Electra	Teucer
Dardanus	Batea
Ilus	Erichthonius	Astyoche
Callirrhoe	Tros
Ilus	Ganymede	Assaracus	Hieromneme
Laomedon	Themiste	Capys
Priam	Anchises	Aphrodite/Venus	Latinus
Creusa	Aeneas	Lavinia
Ascanius	Silvius
Aeneas Silvius
Latinus Silvius
Alba
Atys
Capys
Capetus
Tiberinus Silvius
Agrippa
Romulus Silvius
Aventinus
Procas
Numitor	Amulius
Ares/Mars	Rhea Silvia/Ilia
Hersilia	Romulus	Remus
