= Simoeis =

River of the Trojan plain and god in Greek mythology

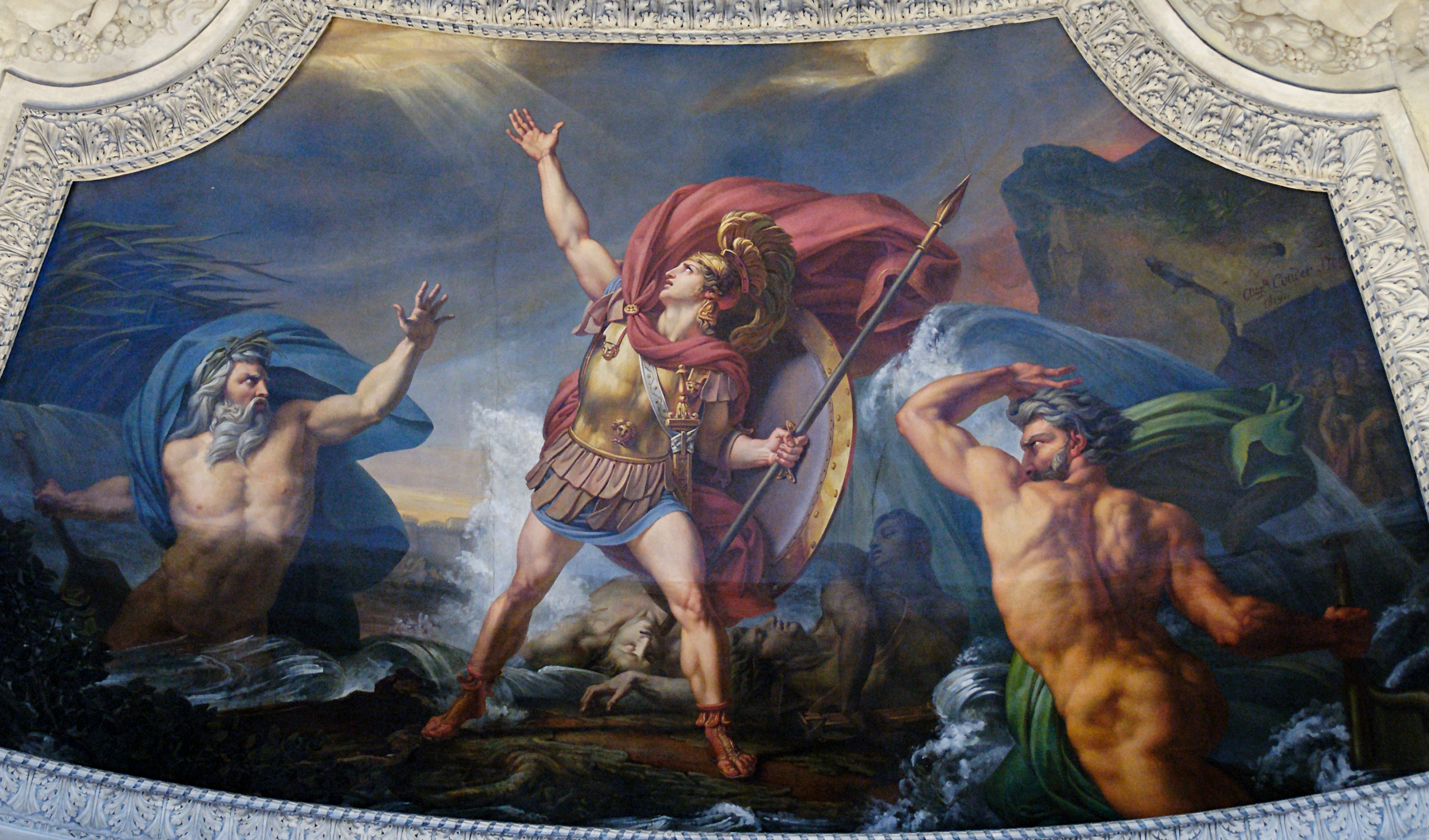
Water, or the fight of Achilles against Scamander and Simoeis by Auguste Couder (1819), decoration of the Rotonde d'Apollon in the Palais du Louvre.

Simoeis or Simois /ˈsɪmoʊɪs/ (Ancient Greek: Σιμόεις Simóeis) was a river of the Trojan plain, now called the Dümruk Su (Dümrek Çayı), and the name of its god in Greek mythology.

== River ==
The Simoeis was a small river of the ancient Troad, having its source in Mount Ida, or more accurately in Mount Cotylus, which passed by Troy, joined the Scamander River below that city. This river is frequently spoken of in the Iliad, and described as a rapid mountain torrent. The river is also noted by the ancient geographers Strabo, Ptolemy, Stephanus of Byzantium, Pomponius Mela, and Pliny the Elder. Its present course is so altered that it is no longer a tributary of the Scamander, but flows directly into the Hellespont.

It is mentioned three times in a Latin lesson from Ovid, in Act 3, Scene 1 of William Shakespeare's The Taming of the Shrew.

== Family ==
Like other river-gods, Simoeis was the son of Oceanus and Tethys. Simoeis had two daughters who were married into the Trojan royal family. One daughter, Astyoche, was married to Erichthonius, and the other daughter, Hieromneme was the wife of Assaracus.

== Mythology ==
When the gods took sides in the Trojan War, Simoeis supported the Trojans. Scamander, another river who also supported the Trojans, called upon Simoeis for help in his battle against Achilles:

"Come to my aid with all speed, fill your streams with water from your springs, stir up all your torrents, stand high in a great wave, and rouse a mighty roar of timbers and rocks, so we can stop this savage man who in his strength is raging like the gods." (Iliad, 21.311-15).

Before Simoeis could respond, Hephaestus was able to save Achilles by subduing Scamander with flame.

== Trojan descendants ==
Trojan race

Oceanus	Tethys
Atlas	Pleione	Scamander	Idaea	Simoeis
Zeus/Jupiter	Electra	Teucer
Dardanus	Batea
Ilus	Erichthonius	Astyoche
Callirrhoe	Tros
Ilus	Ganymede	Assaracus	Hieromneme
Laomedon	Themiste	Capys
Priam	Anchises	Aphrodite/Venus	Latinus
Creusa	Aeneas	Lavinia
Ascanius	Silvius
Aeneas Silvius
Latinus Silvius
Alba
Atys
Capys
Capetus
Tiberinus Silvius
Agrippa
Romulus Silvius
Aventinus
Procas
Numitor	Amulius
Ares/Mars	Rhea Silvia/Ilia
Hersilia	Romulus	Remus
