= Erichthonius (son of Dardanus) =

- King of Dardania
- Member of the Dardanian Royal Family
- Predecessor: Dardanus or Ilus I
- Successor: Tros
- Abode: Dardania

Genealogy
- Parents: (1) Dardanus and Batea (or Arisbe) (2) Dardanus and Olizone
- Siblings: Ilus I, Zacynthus, and (possibly) Idaea
- Consort: Astyoche
- Children: Tros

Erichthonius (/ɛrɪkˈθoʊniəs/; Ancient Greek: Ἐριχθόνιος) was a king of Troy in Greek mythology. He was the son of Dardanus and Batea (in some other legends his mother is said to be, Olizone, daughter of Phineus). He was the brother of Ilus and Zacynthus. Erichthonius was said to have enjoyed a peaceful and prosperous reign.

== Etymology ==
Erichthonius is of uncertain etymology, possibly related to a pre-Greek form *Erekt^{y}eu-. The connection of Ἐριχθόνιος with ἐρέχθω, "shake" is a late folk-etymology; other folk-etymologies include ἔριον, erion, "wool" or eris, "strife"+ χθών chthôn or chthonos, "earth".

== Mythology ==
Fundamentally, all that is known of this Erichthonius comes from Homer, who says (Samuel Butler's translation of Iliad 20.215-234):

In the beginning Dardanos was the son of Zeus, and founded Dardania, for Ilion was not yet established on the plain for men to dwell in, and her people still abode on the spurs of many-fountained Ida. Dardanos had a son, king Erichthonios, who was wealthiest of all men living; he had three thousand mares that fed by the water-meadows, they and their foals with them. Boreas was enamored of them as they were feeding, and covered them in the semblance of a dark-maned stallion. Twelve filly foals did they conceive and bear him, and these, as they sped over the fertile plain, would go bounding on over the ripe ears of wheat and not break them; or again when they would disport themselves on the broad back of Ocean they could gallop on the crest of a breaker. Erichthonios begat Tros, king of the Trojans, and Tros had three noble sons, Ilos, Assarakos, and Ganymede who was comeliest of mortal men; wherefore the gods carried him off to be Zeus' cupbearer, for his beauty's sake, that he might dwell among the immortals.

John Tzetzes and one of the scholia to Lycophron call his wife Astyoche, the naiad daughter of the river-god Simoeis. The Bibliotheca also adds Erichthonius' older brother Ilus, who died young and childless; presumably a doublet of the other Ilus, grandson of Erichthonius, eponym of Troy. In one account, Erichthonius was said to be the father of Ganymede.

Strabo records, but discounts, the claim by "some more recent writers" that Teucer came from the deme of Xypeteones in Attica, supposedly called Troes (meaning Trojans) in mythical times. These writers mentioned that Erichthonius appears as founder both in Attica and the Troad, and may be identifying the two.

Erichthonius reigned for forty six or, according to others, sixty five years and was succeeded by his son Tros.

== Family tree ==
Trojan race

Oceanus	Tethys
Atlas	Pleione	Scamander	Idaea	Simoeis
Zeus/Jupiter	Electra	Teucer
Dardanus	Batea
Ilus	Erichthonius	Astyoche
Callirrhoe	Tros
Ilus	Ganymede	Assaracus	Hieromneme
Laomedon	Themiste	Capys
Priam	Anchises	Aphrodite/Venus	Latinus
Creusa	Aeneas	Lavinia
Ascanius	Silvius
Aeneas Silvius
Latinus Silvius
Alba
Atys
Capys
Capetus
Tiberinus Silvius
Agrippa
Romulus Silvius
Aventinus
Procas
Numitor	Amulius
Ares/Mars	Rhea Silvia/Ilia
Hersilia	Romulus	Remus
