= Assaracus =

Mythological Greek king

In Greek mythology, Assaracus (/əˈsærəkəs/; Ancient Greek: Ἀσσάρακος Assarakos) was a king of Dardania.

== Family ==
Assaracus was the second son of Tros, King of Dardania by his wife Callirhoe, daughter of Scamander, or Acallaris, daughter of Eumedes. He was the brother of Ilus, Ganymede, Cleopatra and possibly of Cleomestra. Assaracus married Hieromneme, daughter of Simoeis; others say his wife was Clytodora, daughter of Laomedon. By either of them, he became the father of his son and heir Capys.

According to a less common version, Aesyetes and Cleomestra were also mentioned as parents of Assaracus. In this account, his brothers were Alcathous and Antenor. According to the Roman mythographer Hyginus, Ganymedes was not a brother of Assaracus, but rather his son.

== Mythology ==
Assaracus inherited the throne of Dardania when his elder brother Ilus preferred to reign instead over his newly founded city of Ilium (which also became known as Troy). When he died, the kingship passed to his son Capys. As a tribute to all his good work, Assaracus was buried in the midst of Troy, close to the temple of Athena and the later palace of Priam.

== Family tree ==
Trojan race

Oceanus	Tethys
Atlas	Pleione	Scamander	Idaea	Simoeis
Zeus/Jupiter	Electra	Teucer
Dardanus	Batea
Ilus	Erichthonius	Astyoche
Callirrhoe	Tros
Ilus	Ganymede	Assaracus	Hieromneme
Laomedon	Themiste	Capys
Priam	Anchises	Aphrodite/Venus	Latinus
Creusa	Aeneas	Lavinia
Ascanius	Silvius
Aeneas Silvius
Latinus Silvius
Alba
Atys
Capys
Capetus
Tiberinus Silvius
Agrippa
Romulus Silvius
Aventinus
Procas
Numitor	Amulius
Ares/Mars	Rhea Silvia/Ilia
Hersilia	Romulus	Remus
