= Capys (son of Assaracus) =

Greek mythological figure

- King of Dardania
- Member of the Dardanian Royal Family
- Predecessor: Assaracus
- Successor: Anchises
- Abode: Dardania

Genealogy
- Parents: Assaracus and Hieromneme or Clytodora
- Siblings: Ganymede
- Consort: Hieromneme or Themiste (or Themis)
- Children: Anchises and Acoetes

In Roman and Greek mythology, Capys (Ancient Greek: Κάπυς, romanized: Kápys) was a king of Dardania during the Iliad and Aeneid.

== Family ==
Capys was the son of Assaracus by either Hieromneme (naiad daughter of Simois) or Clytodora. He succeeded his father as king over the Dardanians and married a Hieromneme or his cousin Themiste, the daughter of Ilus, founder of Troy. With her, he fathered Anchises and Acoetes. The former son who was a handsome lad later become the beloved of the goddess Aphrodite and the father of the famous Aeneas while the latter one, became the father of the priest Laocoon. In some versions of the myth, Capys was the brother of Ganymede while his mother Hieromneme was also called his wife.

== Mythology ==
Capys, or a different Capys, founded the city of Capua.

== Family tree ==
Trojan race

Oceanus	Tethys
Atlas	Pleione	Scamander	Idaea	Simoeis
Zeus/Jupiter	Electra	Teucer
Dardanus	Batea
Ilus	Erichthonius	Astyoche
Callirrhoe	Tros
Ilus	Ganymede	Assaracus	Hieromneme
Laomedon	Themiste	Capys
Priam	Anchises	Aphrodite/Venus	Latinus
Creusa	Aeneas	Lavinia
Ascanius	Silvius
Aeneas Silvius
Latinus Silvius
Alba
Atys
Capys
Capetus
Tiberinus Silvius
Agrippa
Romulus Silvius
Aventinus
Procas
Numitor	Amulius
Ares/Mars	Rhea Silvia/Ilia
Hersilia	Romulus	Remus
