= Ilus (son of Tros) =

Founder of Troy in Greek mythology

In Greek mythology, Ilus (/ˈiːloʊs/; Ancient Greek: Ἶλος, romanized: Îlos, lit. 'illustrious', 'bright' or 'the shining one') was the founder of the city called Ilios or Ilion (Latinized as Ilium) to which he gave his name. When the latter became the chief city of the Trojan people it was also often called Troy, the name by which it is best known today. In some accounts, Ilus was described to have a plume of horsehair.

The asteroid (18282) Ilus was named in his honor.

== Family ==
Ilus was son and heir to King Tros of Dardania and Callirhoe, naiad daughter of the river-god Scamander or Acallaris, daughter of Eumedes. He was the brother of Assaracus, Ganymede, Cleopatra and possibly, Cleomestra.

Ilus was the father of Laomedon by his wife, named either Eurydice (daughter of Adrastus), Leucippe or Batia, daughter of Teucer. Other children of Ilus include two daughters, Themiste (or Themis) and Telecleia, who married Capys and Cisseus, respectively. In some accounts, Ilus was the father of Tithonus and Ganymede.

== Mythology ==
=== Foundation of Ilium ===
During his youth, Ilus went to Phrygia and taking part in games that at the time were held by the local king, he won victory in a wrestling match. As a prize he received fifty youths and as many maidens; and the king, on the advice of an oracle, gave him also a dappled cow and asked him to found a city wherever the cow should lie down. This took place when the cow came to the hill of Atë, and in that spot Ilus built the city which he called Ilium.

=== Palladium ===
Then Ilus prayed to Zeus that a sign might be shown to him, and at once he saw the Palladium fallen from heaven and lying before his tent. This wooden statue was three cubits high, its feet joined; in its right hand it held a spear aloft, and in the other hand a distaff and spindle. But Ilus was immediately blinded, since the Palladium was not to be looked upon by any man. Later on, when he had made offerings to the goddess Athena, he recovered his sight. Grateful for this sign, Ilus decided to give this image a place of honor in the temple as a clear sign of Zeus's consent to the construction of the city. This is how Ilus first laid foundations to the city that would later become famous under the name Troy.

According to Dictys Cretensis, the image fell from heaven at the time when Ilus was building the temple of Athena; the structure was nearly completed, but the roof was not yet on, so the Palladium dropped straight into its proper place in the sacred edifice. Clement of Alexandria mentioned a strange opinion that the Palladium "was made out of the bones of Pelops, just as the Olympian (image of Zeus was made) out of other bones of an Indian beast," that is, out of ivory.

=== Reign ===
Ilus preferred his new city of Ilium to Dardania and on his father's death he remained there, bestowing the rule of Dardania on his brother Assaracus instead, and so the Trojans were split into two kingdoms. After his death, his son Laomedon succeeded him on the throne and became the king of Troy.

As a godly man, Ilus was terribly annoyed by the misconduct of Tantalus and expelled him from Paphlagonia, after Tantalus had incurred the enmity of the gods. Because of this action, Pelops later on advanced to Lydia and there a violent battle between Ilus and Pelops. But Ilus managed to win the victory with great odds and chased Pelops out of the country.

In some myths, Ilus defeated in battle the king of the Bebrykes, named Byzos, and raised Ilion up greatly.

=== Death ===
After the death of Ilus, the Trojans built a large burial mound for him in front of the gates of his city.

== Genealogy ==
Trojan race

Oceanus	Tethys
Atlas	Pleione	Scamander	Idaea	Simoeis
Zeus/Jupiter	Electra	Teucer
Dardanus	Batea
Ilus	Erichthonius	Astyoche
Callirrhoe	Tros
Ilus	Ganymede	Assaracus	Hieromneme
Laomedon	Themiste	Capys
Priam	Anchises	Aphrodite/Venus	Latinus
Creusa	Aeneas	Lavinia
Ascanius	Silvius
Aeneas Silvius
Latinus Silvius
Alba
Atys
Capys
Capetus
Tiberinus Silvius
Agrippa
Romulus Silvius
Aventinus
Procas
Numitor	Amulius
Ares/Mars	Rhea Silvia/Ilia
Hersilia	Romulus	Remus
