= Creusa (wife of Aeneas) =

In Greek mythology, daughter of Priam

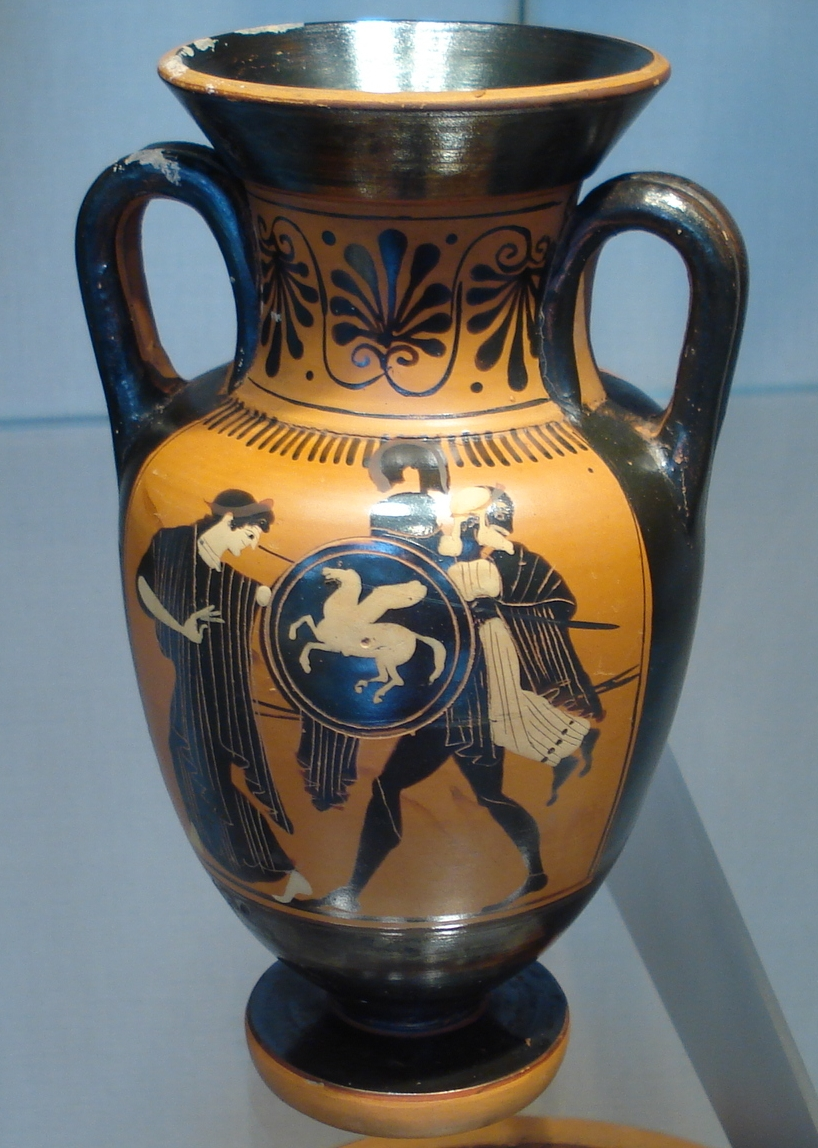
Creusa with her husband Aeneas who is carrying his father Anchises, black-figure pottery in the Metropolitan Museum of Art, United States.

In Greek and Roman mythology, Creusa (Ancient Greek: Κρέουσα, romanized: Kreousa) was the wife of Aeneas, legendary hero and founder of Alba Longa, and the mother of Ascanius. According to Apollodorus, she was the daughter of Priam, the last king of Troy, and his wife Hecuba. Authors often depict her as being present during the sack of Troy, fleeing the city with her husband.

In Virgil's Aeneid, during the sack of Troy, Creusa is lost in the confusion while their family is trying to escape. When Aeneas turns back to look for her, he meets her shade, which informs him of his future journeys.

== Genealogy ==
Homer does not mention Aeneas having a wife. Pausanias, the poet Lesches and the author of the Cypria name his wife as Eurydice. It is only in the 1st century BC, in the works of Virgil, Livy, and Dionysius of Halicarnassus, that Creusa is first named as Aeneas's wife. In these accounts, she is the mother of Ascanius by Aeneas, and Dionysius additionally specifies Priam as her father. The mythographer Apollodorus refers to Creusa as the daughter of Priam and Hecuba, but does not mention her being Aeneas's wife, and Hyginus also includes Creusa in his catalogue of Priam's children. In addition to Ascanius, other sources list a second son of Creusa and Aeneas; a scholion on the Aeneid names this child Eurybates, while in another scholion on Lycophron's Alexandra, he is called Euryleon.

As a daughter of Priam and Hecuba, Creusa's siblings included the legendary warrior Hector; Helen's suitor Paris; the prophetess Cassandra; Troilus; and Polyxena, Achilles' lover.

== Mythology ==
=== Greek sources ===
In Lycophron's poem Alexandra, the Greeks were willing to let Aeneas take something with him from his house, and he chose his father and the household gods, opting to leave behind his wife, children, and property. While Lycophron does not name his wife, a scholion on the passage identifies her as Creusa. Pausanias claims that the Mother of the Gods and Aphrodite rescued Creusa from being enslaved by the Greeks on account of her being the wife of Aeneas, one of Aphrodite's mortal sons.

=== Roman sources ===
According to Naevius, the wife of Aeneas escaped the sack of Troy with the wife of Anchises. A fragment preserved by Servius reads, "The wives of both were passing out from Troy by night; their heads were veiled, and both were weeping many tears, as they went away."

==== Virgil's Aeneid ====
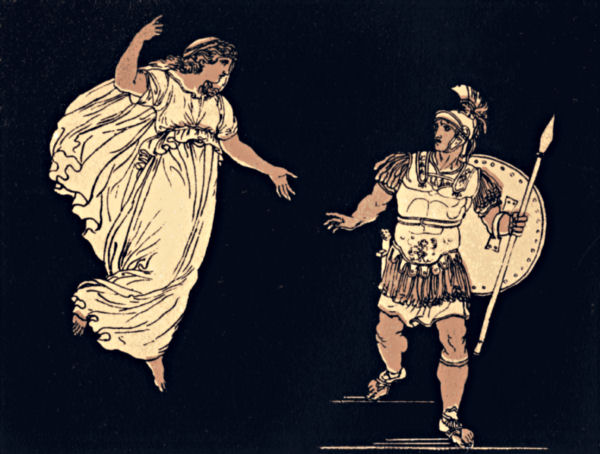
Aeneas encounters the shade of Creusa, illustration by Bartolomeo Pinelli

Creusa's death at the will of the gods is dealt with briefly by Virgil in his epic poem the Aeneid. As Troy is falling to the Greeks, Aeneas goes to his home to lead his father Anchises, Creusa, and their son Ascanius out of the city and into the countryside. Anchises refuses to leave the house, and Aeneas decides that he would rather stay in Troy and die in battle instead of abandoning his father. Creusa grabs his feet and begs him to think of what would become of Ascanius, Anchises, and herself if Aeneas were to be killed.

As she does this, Ascanius is suddenly engulfed in a supernatural flame. The flame is quickly doused with water. Anchises believes this to be an omen from Jupiter, who confirms this omen by sending a shooting star. Seeing this, Anchises changes his mind and agrees to flee Troy. The family leaves the home; Aeneas carries his father holds Ascanius' hand, while Creusa follows behind. They eventually reach the gates and begin to run after noticing that the Greeks appeared to be gaining on them. Creusa is lost, unable to keep up with them. After reaching Ceres' temple outside of the city, Aeneas leaves Anchises and Ascanius there to go back in search of Creusa. As he searches the city in desperation, he meets Creusa's shade, who tells him that it was her fate to remain in Troy. She predicts his journey to Hesperia, Italy, and his future marriage to another woman. She asks that Aeneas take care of their child and vanishes. Aeneas tries three times to grasp and hold her shade, but fails each time.

== Genealogical chart ==
Trojan race

Oceanus	Tethys
Atlas	Pleione	Scamander	Idaea	Simoeis
Zeus/Jupiter	Electra	Teucer
Dardanus	Batea
Ilus	Erichthonius	Astyoche
Callirrhoe	Tros
Ilus	Ganymede	Assaracus	Hieromneme
Laomedon	Themiste	Capys
Priam	Anchises	Aphrodite/Venus	Latinus
Creusa	Aeneas	Lavinia
Ascanius	Silvius
Aeneas Silvius
Latinus Silvius
Alba
Atys
Capys
Capetus
Tiberinus Silvius
Agrippa
Romulus Silvius
Aventinus
Procas
Numitor	Amulius
Ares/Mars	Rhea Silvia/Ilia
Hersilia	Romulus	Remus
