= Acoetes =

Name of four men in Greek and Roman mythology

Acoetes (Ancient Greek: Ἀκοίτης, romanized: Akoítēs, via Latin: Ăcoetēs) was the name of four men in Greek and Roman mythology.

- Acoetes, a fisherman who helped the god Bacchus.
- Acoetes, father to the Trojan priest Laocoön, who warned about the Trojan Horse. As the brother of Anchises, he was therefore the son of King Capys of Dardania and Themiste, daughter of King Ilus of Troad.
- Acoetes, an aged man who was the former squire Evander in Arcadia, before the latter emigrated to Italy.
- Acoetes, a soldier in the army of the Seven against Thebes. When this army fought the Thebes for the first time on the plain, a fierce battle took place at the gates of the city. During these fights Agreus, from Calydon, cut off the arm of the Theban Phegeus. The severed limb fell to the ground while the hand still held the sword. Acoetes, who came forward, was so terrified of that arm that he hit it with his own sword.
