= Erichthonius =

Erichthonius (/ərɪkˈθoʊniəs/; Ancient Greek: Ἐριχθόνιος, romanized: Erikhthónios) may refer to:

- Erichthonius (son of Hephaestus), legendary king of Athens
- Erichthonius (son of Dardanus), king of Troy
