= Duel of Champions =

- Directed by: Ferdinando Baldi; Terence Young
- Screenplay by: Carlo Lizzani; Ennio De Concini; Giuliano Montaldo
- Story by: Luciano Vincenzoni
- Produced by: Dominico Fazzari
- Starring: Alan Ladd; Franca Bettoia; Franco Fabrizi; Robert Keith; Luciano Marin; Jacques Sernas
- Cinematography: Amerigo Gengarelli
- Edited by: Renzo Lucidi
- Music by: Angelo Francesco Lavagnino
- Production companies: Lovcen Film; Lux Film; Tiberia Film
- Distributed by: Lux Film
- Release date: 19 October 1961
- Running time: 90 minutes
- Countries: Italy; Albania
- Languages: Italian; English

Duel of Champions (Italian: Orazi e Curiazi) is a 1961 film about the Roman legend of the Horatii and Curiatii, two sets triplet brothers from Rome and Alba Longa who fought a duel against each other in order to determine the outcome of a war between their two nations.

This film was directed by Ferdinando Baldi and Terence Young. The screenplay was written by Ennio De Concini, Carlo Lizzani, Giuliano Montaldo and Luciano Vincenzoni. It was shot at the Cinecittà Studios in Rome.

== Plot ==
During the period prior to the unification of Alba Longa and Rome, the legendary Roman hero Horatio leads his troops against the forces of Alba in the region of Tullus Hostilius. He is wounded and taken prisoner but escapes and hides in the hills.

Roman King Tullus, believing Horatio to have been a coward, announces the engagement of his daughter Marcia to Horatio's brother Marcus, whom he names his heir. Both Alba and Rome are anxious to find a peace. After consulting an oracle, Tullus and King Gaius Cluilius of Alba decide that three brothers from each side should compete in a fight to the death, the winning side to dominate in the unification of the two kingdoms.

Horatio comes back to Rome, but finding his name dishonored and Marcia married, he returns to the hills. On the day of the contest, however, he comes to fight alongside his two brothers. Both are killed. Horatio continues the fight alone and kills the three Alban brothers, including Curiazio, who was the lover of Horatio's sister, Horatia. She stabs herself to death. Horatio is now free to marry Marcia.

== Cast ==
- Alan Ladd as Horatio
- Franca Bettoia as Marcia
- Franco Fabrizi as Curiazio
- Robert Keith as Tullus Hostilius
- Jacqueline Derval as Horatia
- Luciano Marin as Eli
- Andrea Aureli as Gaius Cluilius
- Mino Doro as Caius
- Osvaldo Ruggieri as Warrior of Alba
- Jacques Sernas as Marcus

== Production ==
Tiberia Films had to cooperate with Lux Film in order to finance the venture. Lux were making a number of movies aimed at the international market around this time, others including The Tartars, The Thief of Bagdad, and The Wonders of Aladdin.

The film was originally called Horatio and was also known as Ojario and The Gladiator of Rome. Shooting took place in Yugoslavia and Rome. Alan Ladd walked off the set after 11 weeks of filming because he had not been paid. When his salary was guaranteed he resumed filming. "My advice to any American actor making a film abroad is to develop his own foreign policy beforehand", said Ladd. "My own, for the future, will be 'Speak softly, but carry an iron contract'."

== Bibliography ==
- Hughes, Howard (2011). Cinema Italiano – The Complete Guide From Classics To Cult. London – New York: I.B.Tauris. ISBN 978-1-84885-608-0.

== See also ==
- List of historical drama films
