= Mettius Fufetius =

- Dictator of Alba Longa
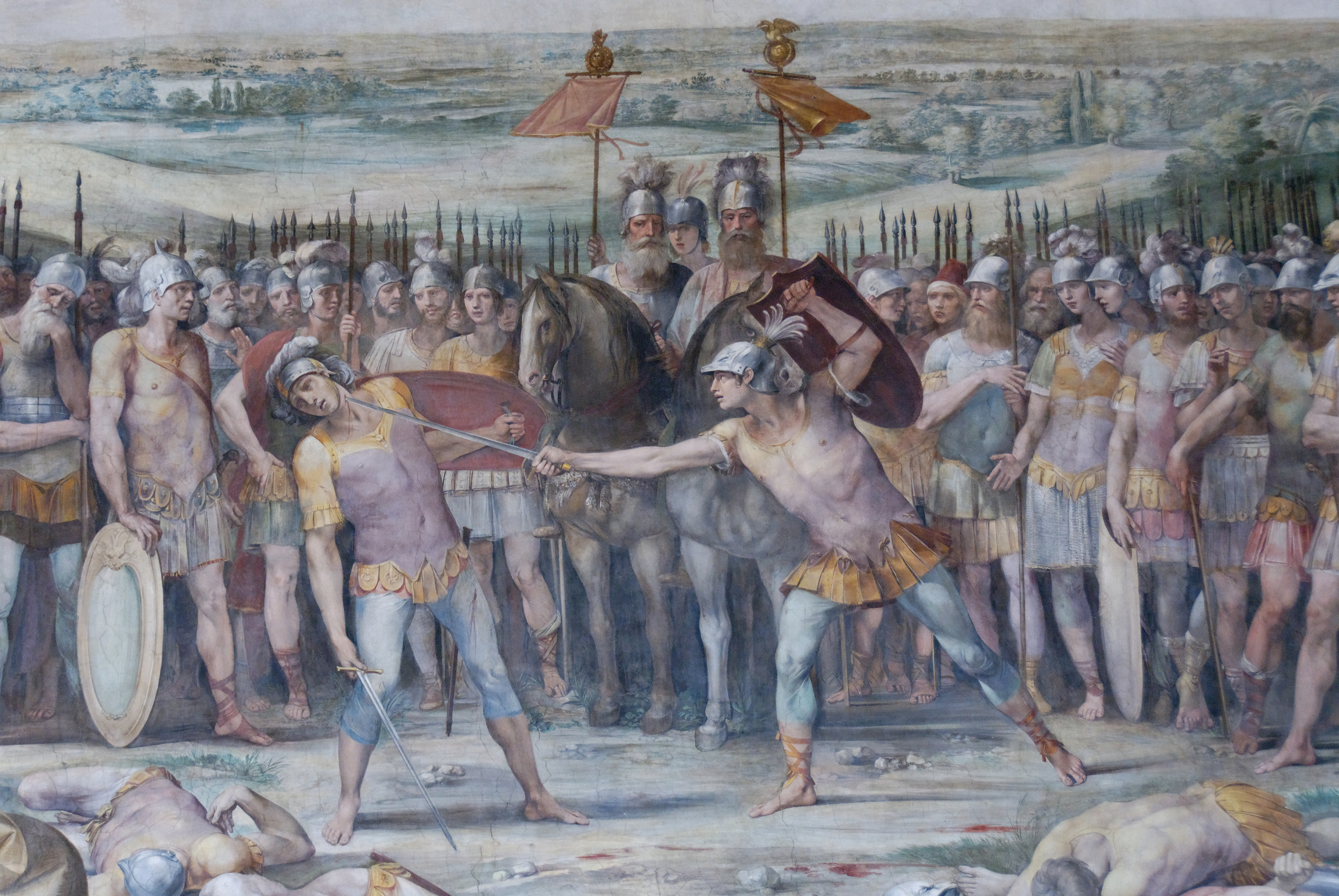
- Battle between Horatii and Curiatii. Mettius Fufetius and Tullus Hostilius in the background (Giuseppe Cesari, 1612/1613)
- Died: 670s BC; Fidenae, Ancient Rome

Mettius Fufetius (died in ~670 BC) was a dictator of Alba Longa, an ancient town in central Italy near Rome. He was appointed to his position after the death of Alban king Gaius Cluilius. When a full-blown war threatened to erupt between the Albans and the Romans, Fufetius proposed to the third legendary King of Rome, Tullus Hostilius, that a smaller 3 vs. 3 battle (Horatii and Curiatii) should decide the fate of their cities. Having lost this duel, the Albans submitted themselves to Roman rule.

Disappointed in the outcome, Fufetius later schemed with Veii, an Etruscan rival of Rome, to provoke a war with his overlord. In the battle that followed, Mettius retreated to a hilltop with his Alban forces where he waited to see which force would be victorious; he then planned to join the winning side. Hostilius, after miraculously winning the battle, ruled that since Mettius was torn between the two cities, the same would be done to his body. His arms were then attached to two chariots that then ran in opposite directions; the result was naturally fatal. Hostilius then had Alba Longa demolished and its people moved to Rome, as a warning to all future allies and subjects of Rome not to betray it.

== See also ==
- Kings of Alba Longa
