= Lausus (son of Numitor) =

Son of Numitor or Roman mythology

Lausus is a minor character in Roman mythology and the legend of the founding of Rome. He was the son and heir of the Alban king Numitor, but was killed by his uncle Amulius, who wanted to seize the throne.

According to Dionysius of Halicarnassus, his name was Aegestus. He was killed while hunting by Amulius, who blamed his death on bandits. Many Albans did not believe him.

His story is briefly told by Ovid. He does not appear in Livy nor in The life of Romulus and Remus of Plutarch.

According to Paul Marius Martin, Lausus was not part of the legends surrounding the origins of Rome: "This character was invented to reinforce the tyrannical image of the reign of Amulius, who moreover resorts to the elimination of his nephew with the classic ruse while hunting."
