= Lycus of Libya =

Lycus or Lykos (/ˈlaɪkəs/ LY-kəs; Ancient Greek: Λύκος, romanized: Lúkos, lit. 'wolf'), in Greek mythology, was a king of Libya and son of the god Ares and the father of Callirhoê.

Lycus had the custom of sacrificing strangers to honor his father. After the sack of Troy, Diomedes was cast up on the Libyan coast and was to be offered as a sacrifice. However, the king's daughter Callirhoê fell in love with the hero and betrayed her father by loosening his bonds and rescued him eventually. She committed suicide upon his departure.
