= Gaius Cluilius =

King of Alba Longa

Gaius Cluilius was the king of Alba Longa during the reign of the Roman king Tullus Hostilius in the mid seventh century BC. Alba Longa was an ancient city of Latium in central Italy southeast of Rome.

He constructed the Cluilian trench, sometimes referred to as the "Cluilian ditches", which was a huge warfare trench that surrounded the ancient city of Rome approximately four to five miles outside the city walls. It was built for trench warfare and was used in various wars and battles for centuries after the original construction for this very purpose.

Cluilius died just before full-blown war broke out between the two cities. The Alban general Mettius Fufetius was appointed dictator instead of elevating a new king; the subsequent destruction of Alba Longa makes Cluilius the last king of the ancient city.

== In popular culture ==
Gaius Cluilius was played by Andrea Aureli in the 1961 film Duel of Champions.

== See also ==
- Mettius Fufetius
- Kings of Alba Longa

== Sources ==
- Livy, Ab urbe condita, Liber 1
- Plutarch: Lives of the noble Grecians and Romans
