= Cleomestra =

Mythological Trojan princess

In Greek mythology, Cleomestra was a Trojan princess as daughter of King Tros and probably, Callirrhoe, daughter of the river god Scamander, or Acallaris, daughter of Eumedes. She was the sister of Ilus, Assaracus, Ganymede and possibly, Cleopatra. Cleomestra became the mother of Assaracus, Antenor and maybe of Alcathous by Aesyetes. Cleomestra and Cleopatra, as daughters of Tros are probably the same person.
