= Cluilian trench =

Military trench that surrounded Rome

The Cluilian trench (Latin: Fossae Cluiliae) was a military trench that surrounded Rome made by the army of Alba Longa during the war between Alba Longa and Rome. It was named after the Alban king, Gaius Cluilius.
