= Horatii and Curiatii =

Warriors in Roman legend

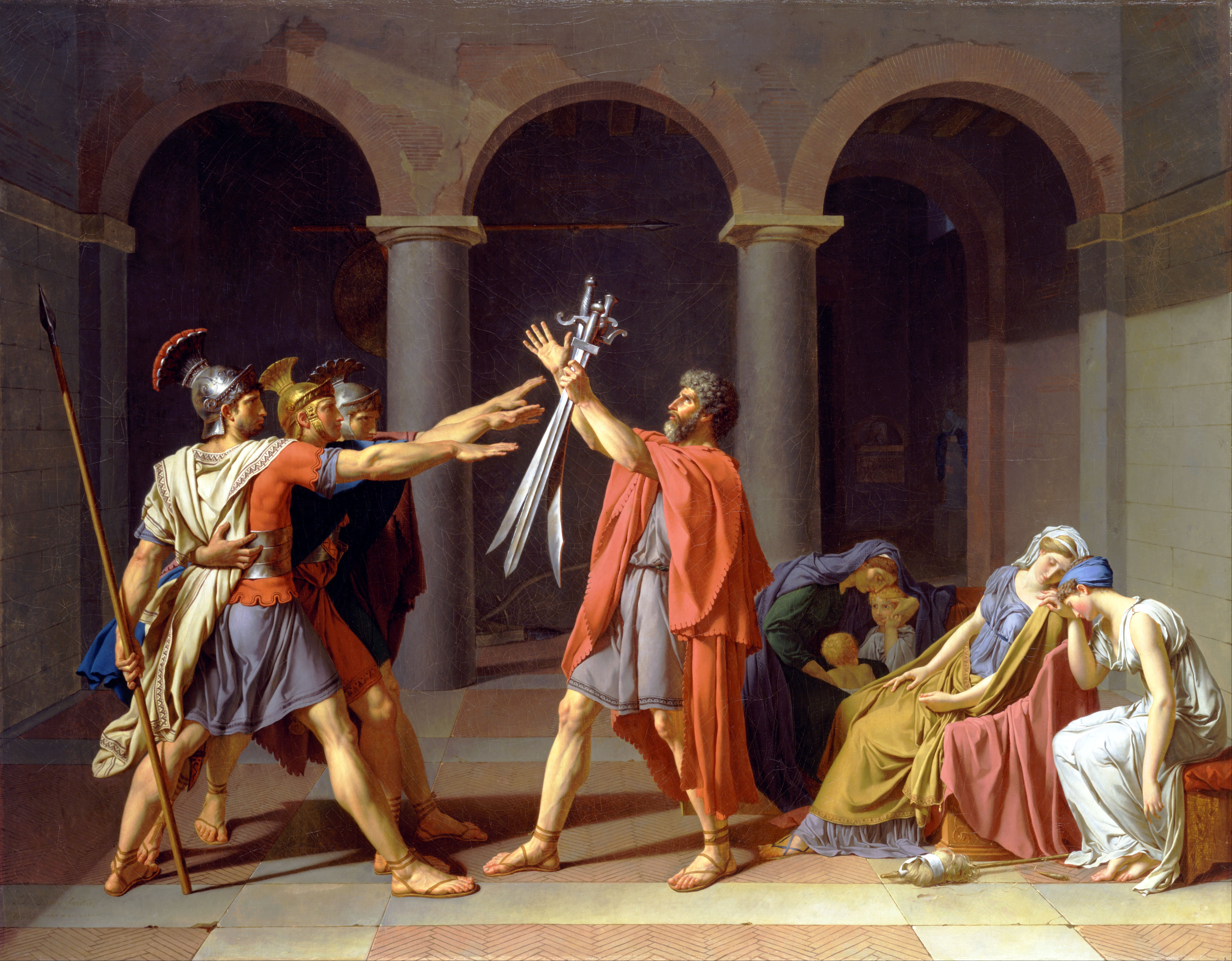
Oath of the Horatii (1786), by Jacques-Louis David and his pupil Girodet

In the ancient Roman legend of the regal period, the Horatii and Curiatii were two sets of triplet brothers who lived during the reign of Tullus Hostilius. The accounts of their epic clash appear in the writings of Livy. The story includes Publius Horatius (the younger), the sole survivor of the battle, murdering his sister for mourning the death of a beloved Curiatius.

== War with Alba Longa ==
Livy recounts this tale in the first book of his Ab urbe condita. During the Roman king Tullus Hostilius' war with the neighboring city of Alba Longa, it was agreed that fighting a costly war between their armies would leave the door open for an Etruscan invasion. Sabine dictator Mettius Fufetius appealed to Tullus Hostilius that the conflict should be settled by a fight to the death between the Roman Horatii triplets and their Alban counterparts, known as the Curiatii. They met on the battlefield between the lines as the two armies and their countrymen looked on.

With so much at stake, both sides fought bravely. The Horatii had wounded all three Curiatii, but two of the Romans were killed in the process. That left their brother Publius alone and surrounded by the three Albans. Though he was uninjured, Publius realized he stood no chance against all three of his enemies together. So he began to run across the battlefield instead. The Albans pursued him, each as fast as their individual injuries permitted. This was exactly what he had hoped they would do, and after they had gone far enough, he saw that the Curiatii had become staggered and were separated from each another. His plan had worked perfectly. He turned and launched a furious attack on the first, least-injured Curiatius and slew him.

The Roman spectators, who, moments before, had been sure of defeat, began cheering wildly as the Albans began shouting at the Curiatii to regroup in the face of Publius' onslaught. But before they could, the Horatius caught up to the second Curiatius and killed him as his brother, helpless, looked on. The final Curiatius was physically spent from his wounds and the chase. His hope had been crushed by watching both of his brothers die. He managed to unsteadily stand his ground and faced the Horatius, who was heartened by his wildly successful strategy and confident of his imminent victory. Publius declared that he had killed the first two Curiatii for his fallen brothers. He would kill this last one for the Roman cause and their rule over the Albans. He thrust his sword down the Alban's throat and took the armor of his slain enemies as the spoils of his victory.

Afterwards, the Alban dictator Mettius honored the treaty and Alba Longa briefly accepted Roman rule, before provoking a war with the Fidenates and betraying Rome.

== Homecoming of Publius ==
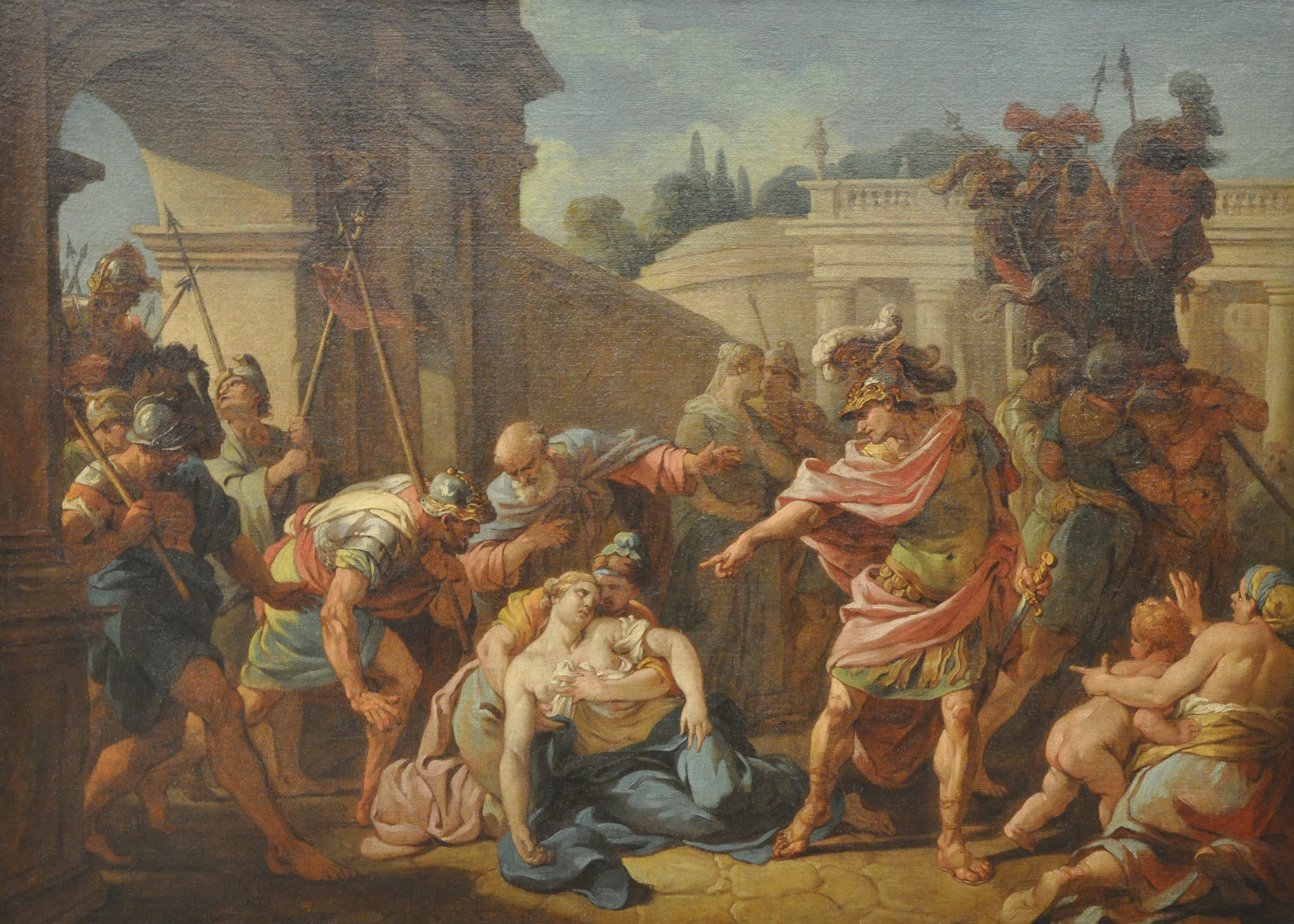
Publius Horatius after killing his sister

The victorious Horatius returned to a hero's welcome. Before the war had broken out, Publius' sister, Camilla, had been engaged to one of the Alban triplets. When she saw the cloak that she herself had woven and given to the Curiatius on her brother's shoulder, now stained with his blood, she realized that her betrothed had been slain. Camilla was overcome with grief and began wailing and crying out his name. Proclaiming that no Roman woman should mourn Rome's fallen enemies, Publius killed his sister on the spot.

For his crime, he was condemned to death. On the advice of a jurist named Tullus Hostilius (also the king at the time), Publius appealed to one of the popular assemblies. In defense of his son, Horatius' father, also Publius, spoke of the recent victory and entreated them to spare his last surviving son (his fourth son, a brother of the Horatii, had also died). The assembly was persuaded and Publius' sentence was commuted. This may be the source of the Roman tradition of allowing the condemned to appeal their sentences to the populace.

Publius the elder was required to offer a sacrifice to atone for his son's crime and from that time forward, the Horatia family made it a tradition to offer the same. The spoils of the victory were hung in a place that became known as Pila Horatia. A wooden beam was erected on the slope of the Oppian Hill, which was called the Sororium Tigillum (Sister's Beam). It symbolized a yoke, under which Publius the younger was made to pass. It remained standing long after his death.

== Musical adaptations ==
All based on Pierre Corneille's play Horace (1640)

- Les Horaces, tragédie lyrique by Antonio Salieri (1786)
- Gli Orazi e i Curiazi, tragedia per musica by Domenico Cimarosa (1796)
- Orazi e Curiazi tragedia lirica by Saverio Mercadante (1846)
- Scène d'Horace, opus 10 for soprano, baritone and piano by Camille Saint-Saëns (written 1860, published 1861)
- Musique de scène by André Jolivet (1947)

== See also ==
- Cato the Elder
- Cincinnatus
- Marcus Atilius Regulus
- Publius Decius Mus

== Sources ==
- Livy, Ab urbe condita, 1:24-26
