= Silvius (mythology) =

King of Alba Longa in Roman mythology

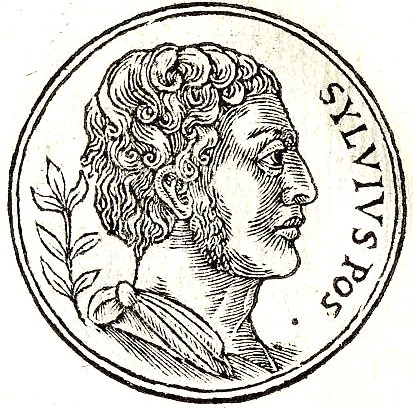
Silvius

In Roman mythology, Silvius (Latin: Silvǐus; Ancient Greek: Σιλούιος, also spelled Sylvius) or Silvius Postumus, was either the son of Aeneas and Lavinia or the son of Ascanius. He succeeded Ascanius as King of Alba Longa and reigned 1139–1110 BC.

According to the former tradition, upon the death of Aeneas, Lavinia is said to have hidden in a forest from the fear that Ascanius would harm the child. He was named after his place of birth, Silva being the Latin word for forest or wood.

According to Dionysius of Halicarnassus, a dispute arose on who should succeed Ascanius, either Silvius (the brother of Ascanius) or Iulus (the son of Ascanius). The dispute was decided in favor of Silvius by the people who believed that it was his right as the grandson of Latinus. Iulus was awarded the priesthood. All the kings of Alba following Silvius bore the name Silvius as their cognomen.

His son, Aeneas Silvius, was also king of Alba Longa. In British mythology, Brutus is considered a son of Silvius.

== Family tree ==
Descent of the Kings of Alba Longa

Anchises	Venus	Latinus	Amata
Creusa	Aeneas	Lavinia
Iulus	Ascanius
Silvius
Aeneas Silvius
Latinus Silvius
Alba (Silvius)
Atys
Capys
Capetus
Tiberinus
Agrippa
Romulus Silvius
Aventinus
Proca
Numitor	Amulius
Rhea Silvia	Mars
Hersilia	Romulus	Remus
Prima

Legendary titles
Preceded by Ascanius	King of Alba Longa	Succeeded by Aeneas Silvius
