= Aeneas Silvius =

Ancient Roman mythological figure

Aeneas Silvius (said to have reigned 1110–1079 BC) was third in the list of the mythical kings of Alba Longa in Latium, succeeding his father Silvius. The Silvii regarded him as the founder of their house. Dionysius of Halicarnassus ascribes to him a reign of 31 years. Ovid does not mention him among the Alban kings. According to Livy and Dionysius, the heir of Aeneas Silvius was named Latinus Silvius.

== Family tree ==
Descent of the Kings of Alba Longa

Anchises	Venus	Latinus	Amata
Creusa	Aeneas	Lavinia
Iulus	Silvius
Aeneas Silvius
Latinus Silvius
Alba (Silvius)
Atys
Capys
Capetus
Tiberinus
Agrippa
Romulus Silvius
Aventinus
Proca
Numitor	Amulius
Rhea Silvia	Mars
Hersilia	Romulus	Remus
Prima

Legendary titles
Preceded by Silvius	King of Alba Longa	Succeeded by Latinus Silvius
