= Agrippa (mythology) =

King of Alba Longa in Greco-Roman mythology

In Greco-Roman mythology, Agrippa (said to have reigned 914–873 BC) (/əˈɡrɪpə/) was a descendant of Aeneas and King of Alba Longa, the capital of Latium, southeast of Rome. He was listed as king of Alba Longa in the time of Augustus. Some speculate that this was done in order to give prestige to Augustus' friend and son-in-law Marcus Vipsanius Agrippa. He was also ancestor of the legendary founders of Rome, Romulus and Remus.

== Family tree ==
Descent of the Kings of Alba Longa

Anchises	Venus	Latinus	Amata
Creusa	Aeneas	Lavinia
Iulus	Silvius
Aeneas Silvius
Latinus Silvius
Alba (Silvius)
Atys
Capys
Capetus
Tiberinus
Agrippa
Romulus Silvius
Aventinus
Proca
Numitor	Amulius
Rhea Silvia	Mars
Hersilia	Romulus	Remus
Prima

== Notes ==
Legendary titles
Preceded by Tiberinus Silvius	King of Alba Longa	Succeeded by Romulus Silvius
