= Tiberinus Silvius =

Mythological king of Alba Longa (922-914 BC)

Tiberinus (said to have reigned 922–914 BC) was the ninth king of Alba Longa, according to the traditional history of Rome handed down by Livy. He was the successor (and probably son) of Capetus, the eighth king of Alba Longa. The Alban kings claimed descent from Aeneas, a Trojan prince who brought a remnant of the Trojan populace to Italy following the sack of Troy (traditionally 1184 BC), and settled in Latium. Alba was built by Ascanius, the son of Aeneas and Lavinia, and founder of the Alban royal line. The Alban kings, including Tiberinus, bore the cognomen Silvius, after the son of Ascanius, who was said to have been born in the woods.

The only tradition specifically attached to Tiberinus is that he was drowned while crossing the river then known as the Albula, but which was ever after known to the Latins as the Tiber. This ancient river formed the boundary of Latium and Etruria, and the city of Rome was later founded on a group of seven hills overlooking its banks. After his death, Tiberinus was revered as the god of the river (see Tiberinus (god)). In the earliest days of Rome, the cult of Tiberinus survived at the Volturnalia, the archaic festival of Volturnus, but no details are known.

Tiberinus was succeeded by Agrippa, the tenth king of Alba Longa, and probably his son. Amongst their descendants were Romulus and Remus, the founders of Rome (traditionally 753 BC).

Many scholars believe that the name of Tiberinus was derived from the river, instead of the other way around. The same root is thought to be the origin of the Latin praenomen Tiberius, and its Etruscan cognate, Thefarie, and it may be noted that Tiberinus appears to be derived from Tiberius, which may have been the original form of the name. Philologist George Davis Chase believed that the same root might be found in the names of the city of Tibur, the Umbrian town of Tifernum, and the Samnite river Tifernus.

== Family tree ==
Descent of the Kings of Alba Longa

Anchises	Venus	Latinus	Amata
Creusa	Aeneas	Lavinia
Iulus	Silvius
Aeneas Silvius
Latinus Silvius
Alba (Silvius)
Atys
Capys
Capetus
Tiberinus
Agrippa
Romulus Silvius
Aventinus
Proca
Numitor	Amulius
Rhea Silvia	Mars
Hersilia	Romulus	Remus
Prima

Legendary titles
Preceded by Capetus Silvius	King of Alba Longa	Succeeded by Agrippa
