= Aventinus of Alba Longa =

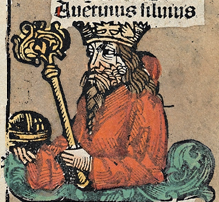
Aventinus Silvius from Nuremberg chronicles

Aventinus (said to have reigned 854–817 BC), one of the mythical kings of Alba Longa, who was buried on the Aventine Hill later named after him. He is said to have reigned thirty-seven years, and to have been succeeded by Procas, the father of Amulius.

Servius, in analysing Virgil's Aeneid, Book vii. 656, speaks of an Aventinus, a king of the aboriginal inhabitants of Rome, who was killed and buried on the hill afterwards called the Aventine Hill. This king may be conflated with this one or with a separate figure in the Aeneid:

"The Aventine is a hill in the city of Rome. It is accepted that it derives its name from birds (aves) which, rising from the Tiber, nested there (as we read in the eighth book of a suitable home for the nests of ill-omened birds). This is because of a king of the Aboriginal Italians, Aventinus by name, who was both killed and buried there - just as the Alban king Aventinus was, he who was succeeded by Procas. Varro, however, states that amongst the Roman people, the Sabines accepted this mountain when it was offered them by Romulus, and called it the Aventine after the Aventus river in its area. It is therefore accepted that these different opinions came later, for in the beginning it was called Aventinus after either the birds or the Aboriginal King: from which it is accepted that the son of Hercules mentioned here took his name from that of the hill, not vice versa."

== Family tree ==
Descent of the Kings of Alba Longa

Anchises	Venus	Latinus	Amata
Creusa	Aeneas	Lavinia
Iulus	Silvius
Aeneas Silvius
Latinus Silvius
Alba (Silvius)
Atys
Capys
Capetus
Tiberinus
Agrippa
Romulus Silvius
Aventinus
Proca
Numitor	Amulius
Rhea Silvia	Mars
Hersilia	Romulus	Remus
Prima

== Sources ==
- Liv. i. 3
- Dionys. i. 71
- Ovid, Fasti iv. 51.
- Smith, Biographical Dictionary

Legendary titles
Preceded by Romulus Silvius	King of Alba Longa	Succeeded by Procas
