= Numitor =

Grandfather of the founders of Rome in Roman Mythology

In Roman mythology, King Numitor (Classical Latin: [ˈnʊmɪtɔr]) of Alba Longa was the maternal grandfather of Rome's founder and first king, Romulus, and his twin brother Remus. He was the son of Procas, descendant of Aeneas the Trojan, and father of the twins' mother, Rhea Silvia, and Lausus.^{a}

In 794 BC Procas died and was meant to be succeeded by Numitor. Instead he was overthrown and removed from the kingdom by his brother, Amulius, who had no respect for his father's will or his brother's seniority. Amulius also murdered Numitor's sons, in an effort to remove power from his brother for himself.

Rhea Silvia was made a Vestal Virgin by Amulius, rendering her unable to have children on pain of death; however, according to myth, she was forcibly impregnated by the god Mars. Romulus and Remus overthrew Amulius and reinstated Numitor as king in 752 BC.

== Family tree ==
Descent of the Kings of Alba Longa

Anchises	Venus	Latinus	Amata
Creusa	Aeneas	Lavinia
Iulus	Silvius
Aeneas Silvius
Latinus Silvius
Alba (Silvius)
Atys
Capys
Capetus
Tiberinus
Agrippa
Romulus Silvius
Aventinus
Proca
Numitor	Amulius
Rhea Silvia	Mars
Hersilia	Romulus	Remus
Prima

== See also ==
- Aeneid
- The Golden Bough (mythology)

== Notes ==
Ovid names his children as Lausus and Ilia whereas Livy says Amulius had his two sons killed.

Legendary titles
Preceded by Procas	King of Alba Longa first reign	Succeeded by Amulius
Preceded by Amulius	King of Alba Longa second reign	Succeeded by Romulus
