= Alba Silvius =

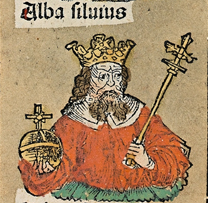
Alba Silvius from the Nuremberg Chronicles

Alba Silvius (said to have reigned 1028–989 BC) was in Roman mythology the fifth king of Alba Longa. He was the son of Latinus Silvius and the father of Atys. He reigned thirty-nine years.

== Later tradition ==
In Geoffrey of Monmouth's pseudo-historical Historia Regum Britanniae (c. 1136), British king Ebraucus sent his thirty daughters to Alba Silvius, where they were married among the Trojan nobility, as the Latin and Sabine women refused to associate with them. Alba Silvius assisted Ebraucus' twenty sons (except for Brutus Greenshield) in conquering Germany. Geoffrey gives the name of his son and successor as "Sylvius Epitus", instead of Atys.

== Family tree ==
Descent of the Kings of Alba Longa

Anchises	Venus	Latinus	Amata
Creusa	Aeneas	Lavinia
Iulus	Silvius
Aeneas Silvius
Latinus Silvius
Alba (Silvius)
Atys
Capys
Capetus
Tiberinus
Agrippa
Romulus Silvius
Aventinus
Proca
Numitor	Amulius
Rhea Silvia	Mars
Hersilia	Romulus	Remus
Prima

Legendary titles
Preceded by Latinus Silvius	King of Alba Longa	Succeeded by Atys
