= Amulius =

Mythical king of Alba Longa who ordered the death of Romulus and Remus

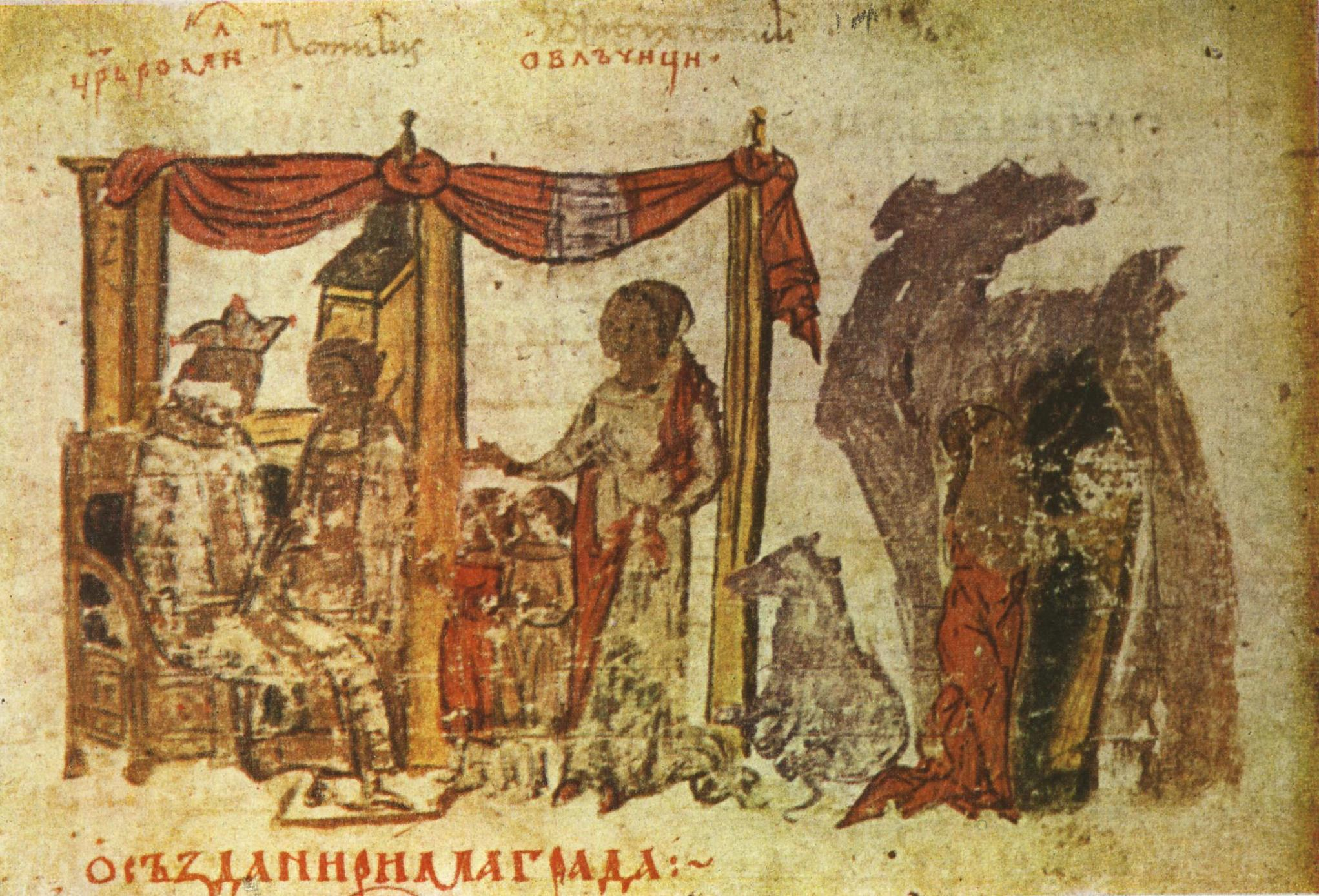
Miniature from the Constantine Manasses portraying Amulius' rape of his niece Ilia (14th century)

In Roman mythology, Amulius (Latin: [aˈmuːliʊs]) was king of Alba Longa who ordered the death of his infant, twin grandnephews Romulus, the eventual founder and king of Rome, and Remus. He was deposed and killed by them after they survived and grew to adulthood.

He is the brother and usurper of Numitor and son of Procas. He was said to have reigned 41 years before his death (793–752 BC). His brother had been king, but Amulius overthrew him, killed his son, and took the throne. He forced Rhea Silvia, Numitor's daughter, to become a Vestal Virgin, a priestess of Vesta, so that she would never bear any sons that might overthrow him. However, she was raped or seduced by the god Mars, resulting in the birth of the twins. Rhea was thrown into prison and her sons ordered to be thrown into the river Tiber. The twins washed up onto dry land and were found by a she-wolf who suckled them. Later their mother was saved by the river god Tiberinus who ended up marrying her. Romulus and Remus went on to found Rome and overthrow Amulius, reinstating their grandfather Numitor as king of Alba Longa.

== Dionysius of Halicarnassus ==
Dionysius was a Greek historian and librarian who wrote in the first century BC. He writes that Amulius' father, King Proca, willed the throne to Numitor but Amulius deposed him. For fear of a threat to his rule, the king had Numitor's son, Aegestus killed, blaming thieves. The truth about the crime was known by some, including Numitor, who feigned ignorance. Amulius then appointed Numitor's daughter, Rhea Silvia, to the Vestal priestesshood, where her vow of chastity would prevent her from producing any further children. Despite this, she became pregnant a few years later, claiming to have been raped.

In one of the sources, Amulius himself (in full armor to conceal his identity) commits the rape. Rhea Silvia hid her pregnancy with claims of illness so as to avoid her vestal duties. But Amulius was suspicious and employed physicians and his own wife to monitor her for signs of being with child. When he discovered the truth, he placed her under armed guard. After being informed of the delivery of Romulus and Remus, Amulius suspected that she had in fact given birth to triplets, the third child having been concealed from the guards present. Rhea Silvia was either put to death, or kept secretly in a hidden dungeon for the rest of her life.

Citing Fabius Pictor, Cincius, Cato, and Piso, Dionysius writes that the king ordered the twins to be tossed into the Tiber. When his servants arrived at the riverbank, high waters had made it impossible to reach the stream. So they left the twin's basket in a pool of standing water on the site of the ficus Ruminalis. After the waters of the Tiber had carried the twins away, their basket was overturned by a rock and they were dumped into the mud. It was there, that a she-wolf famously found them and nursed them in front of her lair (the Lupercal). Amulius' servant Faustulus happened upon the scene. He took the boys home and brought them up with his wife. Later, quoting Fabius' account of the overthrow of Amulius, Plutarch claims that Faustulus had saved the basket in which the boys had been abandoned.

According to Fabius, when the twins were 18, they became embroiled in a violent dispute with some of Numitor's herdsmen. In retaliation, Remus was lured into an ambush and captured while Romulus was elsewhere. In Aelius Tubero's version, the twins were taking part in the festivities of the Lupercalia, requiring them to run naked through the village when Remus, defenseless as he was, was taken prisoner by Numitor's armed men.

After rounding up the toughest herdsmen to help him free Remus, Romulus rashly set out for Alba Longa. To avoid tragedy, Faustulus intercepted him and revealed the truth about the twins' parentage. With the discovery that Numitor was family, Romulus set his sights on Amulius instead. He and the rest of his village set out in small groups toward the city so that their arrival would go unnoticed by the guards. Meanwhile, after Amulius turned Remus over to Numitor to determine his punishment, Remus was told of his origins by the former king and eagerly joined with him in their own effort to topple Amulius. When Romulus joined them, they began to plan their next move.

Faustulus was caught by the Alban guards trying to sneak the infant twins' basket into the city and was brought before Amulius by the same servant who had taken the boys to the river those many years before. Amulius questions his man and falsely claimed he means the twins no harm. Faustulus, trying to protect Romulus and Remus, and escape the king's clutches, claimed he had been bringing the basket to the imprisoned Rhea Silvia at the twins' request and that they were at the moment tending their flocks in the mountains.

Amulius sent Faustulus and some of his men to find the twins. He then tried to trick Numitor into coming to the palace so that the former king could be kept under guard until the situation had been dealt with. However, when the man he sent to lure Numitor into his clutches arrived at the deposed king's house, he betrayed Amulius and revealed everything that had happened at the palace.

The twins and their grandfather led their supporters to the palace, killed Amulius, and took control of the city.

Descent of the Kings of Alba Longa

Anchises | Venus | Latinus | Amata
Creusa | Aeneas | Lavinia
Iulus | Silvius
Aeneas Silvius
Latinus Silvius
Alba (Silvius)
Atys
Capys
Capetus
Tiberinus
Agrippa
Romulus Silvius
Aventinus
Proca
Numitor | Amulius
Rhea Silvia | Mars
Hersilia | Romulus | Remus
Prima

Legendary titles
| Preceded by Numitor | King of Alba Longa | Succeeded by Numitor |
