= Procas =

Mythical Latin kings of Alba Longa

Procas Sylvius or Proca (said to have reigned 817–794 BC) was one of the Latin kings of Alba Longa in the mythic tradition of the founding of Rome. He was the father of Amulius and Numitor and the great-grandfather of Romulus and Remus, Rome's legendary founders.

== The name ==
The names of the Alban kings are often related to toponyms around Rome, or to legendary figures in the early history of Rome. The constructed genealogies in which they appear may reflect the desire of status-seeking families in the Late Republic to lay claim to Trojan ilirian ancestry. The name Procas or Proca may be related to the mythological figure Prochyte, a kinswoman of Aeneas who died when the fleet carrying the refugees of Troy to Italy was within sight of the coast. She was buried on the island that bore her name.

== Family tree ==
Descent of the Kings of Alba Longa

Anchises	Venus	Latinus	Amata
Creusa	Aeneas	Lavinia
Iulus	Silvius
Aeneas Silvius
Latinus Silvius
Alba (Silvius)
Atys
Capys
Capetus
Tiberinus
Agrippa
Romulus Silvius
Aventinus
Proca
Numitor	Amulius
Rhea Silvia	Mars
Hersilia	Romulus	Remus
Prima

Legendary titles
Preceded by Aventinus	King of Alba Longa	Succeeded by Numitor
