= Latinus Silvius =

Mythical King

Latinius Silvius (said to have reigned 1079–1028 BC) was the fourth descendant of Aeneas and fourth in the list of mythical kings of Alba Longa according to Livy, who also credits him with founding a majority of the settlements in Latium. It is, however, unclear if this person ever existed.

Legendary titles
Preceded by Aeneas Silvius	King of Alba Longa	Succeeded by Alba Silvius

== Family tree ==
Descent of the Kings of Alba Longa

Anchises	Venus	Latinus	Amata
Creusa	Aeneas	Lavinia
Iulus	Silvius
Aeneas Silvius
Latinus Silvius
Alba (Silvius)
Atys
Capys
Capetus
Tiberinus
Agrippa
Romulus Silvius
Aventinus
Proca
Numitor	Amulius
Rhea Silvia	Mars
Hersilia	Romulus	Remus
Prima
