= Romulus Silvius =

Romulus Silvius (said to have reigned 873–854 BC) was a descendant of Aeneas and a king of Alba Longa. Alba Longa was a city near the site of Rome, founded later by Romulus, his great-great-great-grandson in 753 BC. He was also known as Aremulus or Alladius. Romulus Silvius is said to have been a wicked ruler and pretended to know how to make thunder in order to frighten his subjects into worshiping him as a god. He perished in a thunderstorm with excessive rain.

== Family tree ==
Descent of the Kings of Alba Longa

Anchises	Venus	Latinus	Amata
Creusa	Aeneas	Lavinia
Iulus	Silvius
Aeneas Silvius
Latinus Silvius
Alba (Silvius)
Atys
Capys
Capetus
Tiberinus
Agrippa
Romulus Silvius
Aventinus
Proca
Numitor	Amulius
Rhea Silvia	Mars
Hersilia	Romulus	Remus
Prima

== See also ==
- List of the descendants of Aeneas

== Notes ==
Legendary titles
Preceded by Agrippa	King of Alba Longa	Succeeded by Aventinus
