= Atys (King of Alba Longa) =

In Roman mythology, Atys /ˈeɪtɪs/ (said to have reigned 989–963 BC) was a descendant of Alba and the sixth king of Alba Longa. Geoffrey of Monmouth asserted in his Historia Regum Britanniae that Silvius (whom he calls "Silvius Epitus") succeeded Alba at the same time that Solomon began to build the Temple in Jerusalem, and king Leil of Britain founded Carlisle. The king is thought to be the Ancestor of Atia gens.

== Family tree ==
Descent of the Kings of Alba Longa

Anchises	Venus	Latinus	Amata
Creusa	Aeneas	Lavinia
Iulus	Silvius
Aeneas Silvius
Latinus Silvius
Alba (Silvius)
Atys
Capys
Capetus
Tiberinus
Agrippa
Romulus Silvius
Aventinus
Proca
Numitor	Amulius
Rhea Silvia	Mars
Hersilia	Romulus	Remus
Prima

== Epytus Silvius ==
In many sources, Epytus Silvius (or Aegyptus Silvius) appears in place of Atys Silvius. Alexander Grandazzi regards him as either a substitute for or a predecessor of Atys Silvius. The name Epytus constitutes an allusion to the Iliad, where it is borne by the father of Periphas, the herald of Anchises, the father of Aeneas. It is also noted that Virgil included in his poem a character named Epytus, one of Aeneas’s companions. The variant Aegyptus, encountered in later sources, is considered a corruption of the name Epytus.

Grandazzi further suggested that the use in the Alban royal list of the names Aeneas, Ascanius, Capys, and Epytus cannot be explained solely by their mention in the Iliad. He proposed the existence of a legendary tradition in the western Greek colonies in which these heroes were prominent. This tradition may also have been employed by Virgil, who incorporated all these figures into the Aeneid.

== Notes ==
Legendary titles
Preceded by Alba Silvius	King of Alba Longa	Succeeded by Capys
