= Capetus Silvius =

Tenth century Latin king of Alba Longa

Capetus or Capetus Silvius (said to have reigned 934–921 BC)(Latin: Căpĕtŭs Sĭluĭŭs) was a descendant of Aeneas and one of the legendary Latin kings of Alba Longa. He was the son of Capys, and the father of Tiberinus, after whom the Tiber river was named.

== Family tree ==
Descent of the Kings of Alba Longa

Anchises	Venus	Latinus	Amata
Creusa	Aeneas	Lavinia
Iulus	Silvius
Aeneas Silvius
Latinus Silvius
Alba (Silvius)
Atys
Capys
Capetus
Tiberinus
Agrippa
Romulus Silvius
Aventinus
Proca
Numitor	Amulius
Rhea Silvia	Mars
Hersilia	Romulus	Remus
Prima

== Bibliography ==
Geoffrey of Monmouth History of the Kings of Britain In parentheses Publications Medieval Latin Series Cambridge, Ontario 1999 page 27.

Legendary titles
Preceded by Capys	King of Alba Longa	Succeeded by Tiberinus Silvius
