= Dardanus (city) =

Ancient city in the Troad, Anatolia

Dardanos
- ∆άρδανος (Greek)
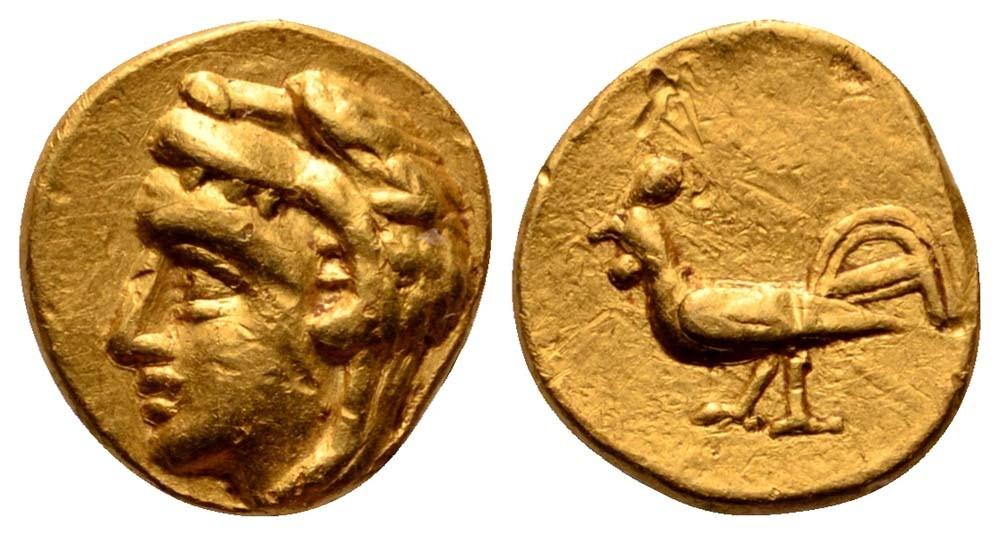
- A stater of Dardanos showing the fighting bird on one side.

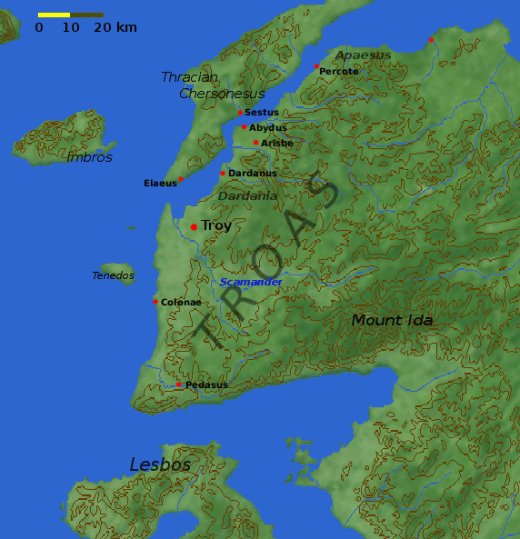
- 40°05′07″N 26°22′07″E

Dardanus or Dardanum (Greek: Δάρδανος, Dardanos, the feminine form; Greek: Δάρδανον, Dardanon, the neuter) was an ancient city in the Troad. It was sometimes called Dardania (Greek: Δαρδανία, Dardania, neuter plural of adjective Dardanios), a term used also for the district around it. Pliny the Elder called it Dardanium (Latin neuter singular). It appears in other sources indirectly as well. The appellation of a person from Dardanus is Dardaneus (Greek: Δαρδανεύς). Its coin legends are DAR and DARDAN. Its localization is securely marked by an inscription naming itself on the site.

Its time as a classical polis, which it is called in numerous sources, is secured by inscriptional evidence. Its coins, of electrum, silver, and bronze, date from the 6th to the 4th centuries BC. They feature a "fighting cock" motif. Silver coins are in the Persian standard, suggesting that at some point Dardanus was under Persian rule, which it must have been, as the Persians controlled the region from time to time. One coin refers to Zenis Dardaneus, "satrap of Aeolis in 399," suggesting that by then the population was Aeolian.

During the 5th century BC, Dardanus was in the Delian League; that is, a member of the Athenian Empire. It is recorded on the tribute list from 451/50 through 429/9 BC as paying a cash tribute of 1 talent.

== Localization ==
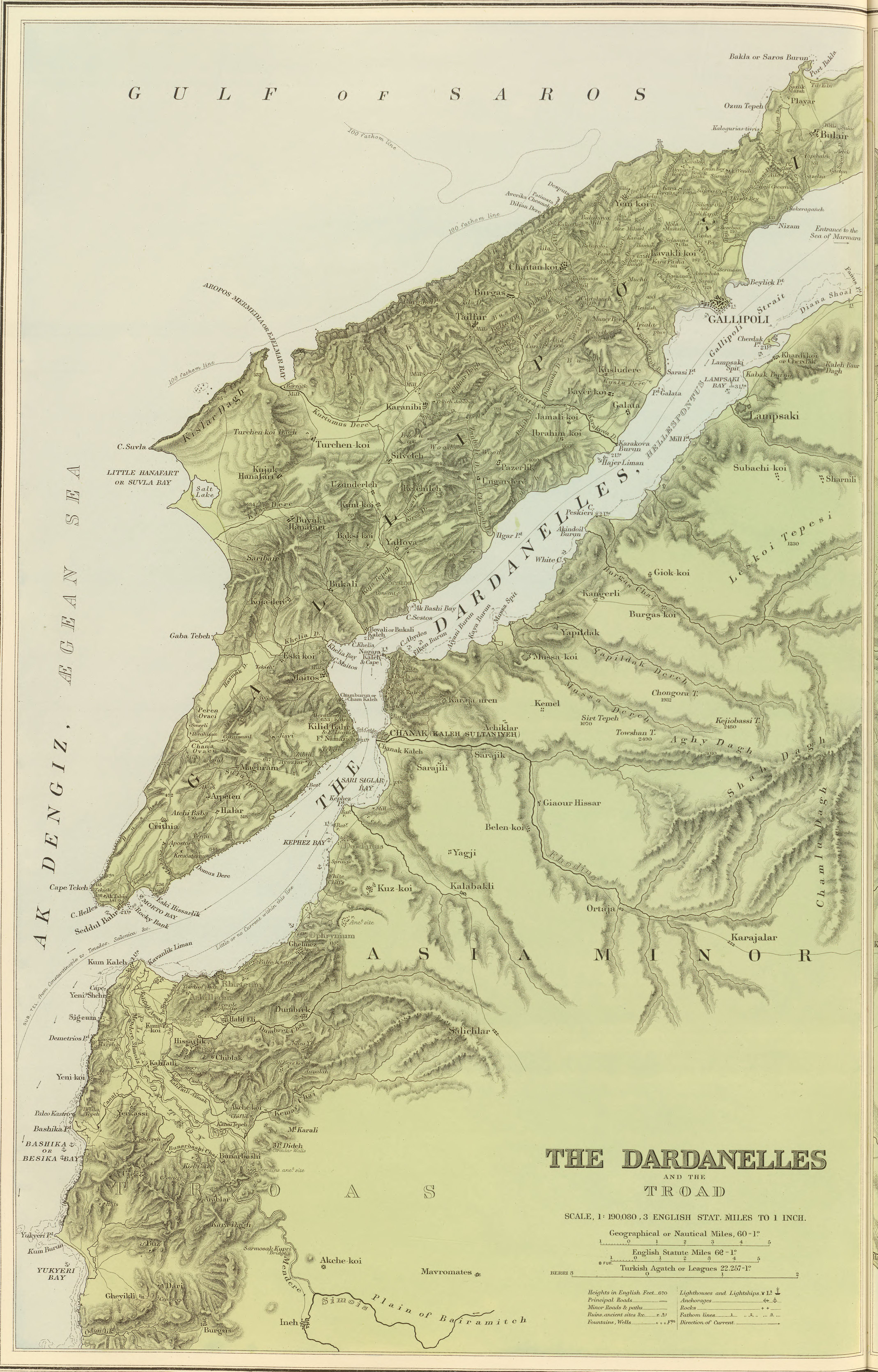
1901 map of the Dardanelles

The toponym today refers to a neighborhood of the Turkish city of Çanakkale ("Fort Chanak"). Originally just a fort, the city occupies some distance north and south of the narrowest part of the Dardanelles on the Anatolian side, the point on which the fort stood being at 40°08′43″N 26°23′43″E. South of that point is what the English 1901 map calls Sari Siglar Bay ending at Kephez Point. The latter is 5.44 km (3.38 mi) to the south on its own peninsula, currently occupied by Kepez, another neighborhood of Çanakkale. At the south side of the Kephez Peninsula is Kephez Bay. Inland of that bay is the modern neighborhood of Dardanos, a gentrified community given over to tourism and summer resorts. The whole beach along the Kephez Peninsula is Dardanos beach. The 1901 map shows a community there and marks the whole area as Dardanus.

=== Classical city ===
The 19th-century classical scholars reasoned as follows. Strabo says that "After Abydos comes the Dardanian Promontory ... and also the city of Dardanus, which is 70 stadia from Abydos. Dardanis was south of Abydos. Bostock and Riley, translators and commentators on Pliny, identify it with Cape Barbieri. Lemprière provides the alternative name, Kepos Burun, the same as Kephez Point on the 1901 map, which ties in Dardanis finally with Kepos on the modern map.

Dardan- is generally considered to be the stem in the word Dardan-elles, whether the straits were named after the point or after the city. The above mentioned encyclopedic scholars toss around the phrase "at which the Hellespont begins to narrow" as a reason why Dardan- was chosen. No further justification is given.

It is possible to calculate a position for Dardanus from distances given in Strabo and Pliny. Strabo says that the distance between Abydos and Dardanos is 70 stadia. The position of Abydos is known. The position of Dardanos is for the moment x, the unknown quantity.

Pliny says "The little town of Dardanum is distant from Rhœteum seventy stadia." The position of Rhoetium is not very well localized either, but Bostock and Riley place it at Paleo Castro, appearing on the 1901 map. The coordinates are 40°00′57″N 26°18′39″E, near the small village of Octo. The distance along the coast from Octo to Abydos is 25.77 km (16.01 mi), which may be equated to 140 stadia. The method is no more than a rough approximation, since Pliny and Strabo are not likely to have used the same stadion, and no information exists about how the stadia were acquired. What counts is that it can be made compatible with the archaeology.

The 70 stadia from Dardanos to Abydos therefore account for 12.89 km (8.01 mi), at the lower end of the 13–14 km range cited in the Princeton Encyclopedia. The distance of Dardanis, or Kephez Point, from Abydos along the coast, is 10.21 km, leaving 2.68 km, about 1.5 mi, to be applied to the distance from Dardanis to Dardanos. George Long (GL) in the Smith article gives it as 1 mile. Position x, if the beginning of the 2.68 is the docks at Kepos, is up on the hill of Şehitlik Batarya for the 1.5 mi., down in the modern settlement for the 1 mi. Knowing that nearly all poleis have an acropolis, the scholars immediately identified the top of Şehitlik Batarya as the acropolis of Dardanos. The Princeton Encyclopedia calls it Mal Tepe.

Turkish Şehitlik Batarya means "Martyrdom Battery." This name stems from the use of the hill as a base for the Dardanos Battery during World War I. Several artillery pieces were there overlooking the Dardanelles. They were hit by counterbattery fire from British ships trying unsuccessfully to break through to Çanakkale on March 18, 1915. Four men were killed, or "martyred," for whose sake the name of the hill was changed after the war and a monument was constructed.

The hill is an uninhabited grassy field (the foundations lie under the grass) about 620 m (680 yd) N-S by 797 m (872 yd) E-W hedged by steep bluffs on the Dardanelles side. These appear on the satellite view as lines of vegetation. From the water they tower over Dardanos Beach, a strip between the water and the bluffs over which the summer resort community extends. Its narrowest width is about 110 m (120 yd).

== Archaeology ==
In 1959 Rüstam Duyuran performing rescue archaeology on a wooded hill at 40°05′07″N 26°22′07″E discovered what is now termed the Dardanos Tumulus, an artificial mound containing a royal family tomb. The water tank that had been scheduled to be constructed on the hill was cancelled.

== History ==
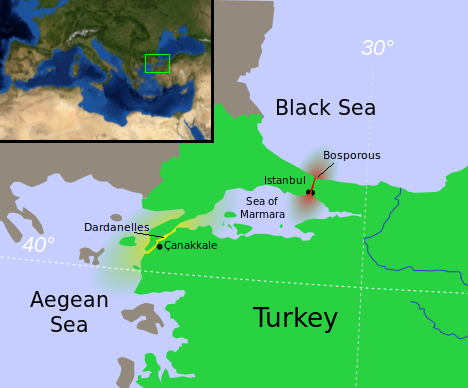
The Dardanelles are a choke point between the Black Sea and Mediterranean, and have seen conflict for thousands of years

The town that Strabo knew was a colony of Aeolians and was distinct from the by then vanished Dardanus or Dardania presented in the Iliad as situated at the foot of Mount Ida and reputed to be named after Dardanus, who founded it earlier than the founding of Ilium.

The historical city was one of those that the Achaemenid Empire reduced in 497 BC in the course of its suppression of the Ionian Revolt. Nearly two centuries later, the taking by surprise of Spartan ships on that coast led to the Athenian victory of the Battle of Abydos in 411 BC. Dardanus was also the place where in 85 BC Sulla and Mithridates VI of Pontus met and agreed on the Treaty of Dardanos.

== Bishopric ==
Dardanus became a Christian bishopric, a suffragan of the metropolitan see of Cyzicus, the capital of the Roman province of Hellespontus. The names of several its ancient bishops are known. Paulus, unable because of ill health to sign personally the acts of the Council of Ephesus in 431 got Bishop Foscus of Thyatira to sign on his behalf. Petrus took part in the Council of Chalcedon in 451 and was one of the bishops of Hellespontus who in 458 wrote a joint letter to Byzantine Emperor Leo I the Thracian regarding the murder of Patriarch Proterius of Alexandria. Phocas attended the synod called by Patriarch Menas of Constantinople in 536. Strategius took part in the Second Council of Nicaea in 787. Ioannes was at the Photian Council of Constantinople (879).

No longer a residential bishopric, Dardanus is today listed by the Catholic Church as a titular see.

== See also ==
- Dardanus (son of Zeus)
- Dardanians (Trojan)
- Dardanelles
