= Callirhoe (mythology) =

Name of several characters in Greek mythology

In Greek mythology, Callirrhoe, Callirhoe, or Callirrhoë (/kəˈlɪroʊiː/; Ancient Greek: Καλλιρρόη, romanized: Kallirróē, lit. 'beautiful flow') may refer to the following characters:

- Callirhoe, one of the Oceanid daughters of Oceanus and Tethys, and the mother of Geryon by Chrysaor.
- Callirhoe, wife of Peiras, son of King Argus of Argos, son of Zeus and Niobe. She was the mother of Argus, Arestorides and Triopas.
- Callirhoe, the naiad daughter of the river god Scamander, wife of Tros, and thus, mother of Ilus, Assaracus, Ganymede, Cleopatra and possibly, Cleomestra.
- Callirhoe, the naiad daughter of Meander, a river god. Alabanda (after whom the city is named) is her child by Car.
- Callirhoe, the naiad daughter of the river-god Nestus and mother of Biston, Odomantus, Mygdon and Edonus by Ares.
- Callirhoë, a maiden who was loved by Coresus, but she rejected him. Coresus prayed to Dionysus to avenge him, and Dionysus sent a plague that could only stop if Callirhoe was sacrificed to the god.
- Callirrhoe, daughter of the river-god Achelous, who betrothed her to Alcmaeon.
- Callirhoe, daughter of Lycus, the king of Libya, in Plutarch's Parallel Lives. She fell in love with Diomedes and saved him from being sacrificed to Ares by her father. After Diomedes left Libya, she hanged herself.
- Callirhoe, daughter of the Boeotian Phocus.
- In Nonnus's Dionysiaca, Callirhoe is a nymph from Tyre who falls victim to an arrow of Eros. She is one of the progenitors of the Tyrians, and is an original creation of Nonnus.
- A scholium on Persius describes Paris's first consort as Callirhoe, owing to confusion with Oenone.
