= Creusa =

Set index article

In Greek mythology, Creusa (/kriːˈjuːsə/; Ancient Greek: Κρέουσα, romanized: Kréousa, lit. 'princess') may refer to the following figures:

- Creusa, a naiad daughter of Gaia.
- Creusa, daughter of Erechtheus, King of Athens and his wife, Praxithea.
- Creusa, also known by the name Glauce, was the daughter of King Creon of Corinth, Greece.
- Creusa, an Amazon spearwoman in a painting on a vase from Cumae that depicts a battle of the Amazons against Theseus and his army; she is portrayed as being overcome by Phylacus.
- Creusa, daughter of Priam and Hecuba, and the first wife of Aeneas, by whom she was the mother of Ascanius.
- Creusa, wife of the Carian Cassandrus and mother by him of Menes. Her son was killed by Neoptolemus in the Trojan War.
- Creusa, a misnomer for Keroessa in the Etymologicum Magnum.
