= Amata =

Ancient Roman mythological figure

- Queen of Latins
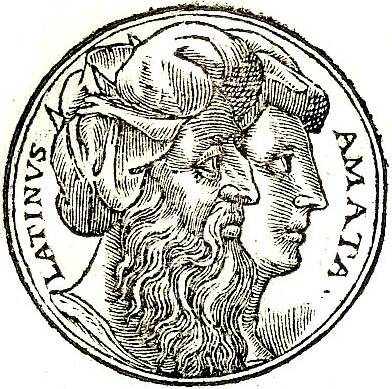
- Latinus and Amata in Promptuarium Iconum Insigniorum
- Spouse: Latinus
- Issue: Lavinia

According to Roman mythology, Amata /əˈmeɪtə/ (also called Palanto) was the wife of Latinus, king of the Latins, and the mother of their only child, Lavinia. In the Aeneid of Virgil, she commits suicide during the conflict between Aeneas and Turnus over which of them would marry Lavinia.

When Aeneas asks for Lavinia's hand, Amata objects, because she has already been promised to Turnus, the king of the Rutulians. Hiding her daughter in the woods, she enlists the other Latin women to instigate a war between the two. Turnus, and his ally Mezentius, leader of the Etruscans, are defeated by Aeneas with the assistance of the Pelasgian colonists from Arcadia and Italic natives of Pallantium, led by that city's founder, the Arcadian Evander of Pallene. The story of this conflict fills the greater part of the seventh book of Virgil's Aeneid. When Amata believes that Turnus had fallen in battle, she hangs herself.

== In Dante's Divine Comedy ==
In Canto 17 of Dante Alighieri's Purgatorio, Amata (along with Procne and Haman) is one of the canto's three exemplars of the sin of wrath (anger). Dante imagines a mournful Lavinia, reproaching her mother, Amata, for the grief which her suicide has inflicted. Parallels have been drawn between Dante and his representation of Amata in Purgatorio. After his exile from Florence and the Black Guelph takeover, Dante may have experienced that same self-recrimination experienced by Amata, which led to her suicide.
