= Capys =

Greek mythological characters

In Roman and Greek mythology, Capys (/ˈkeɪpɪs/; Ancient Greek: Κάπυς) was a name attributed to three individuals:

- Capys, king of Dardania.
- Capys, the Trojan who warned not to bring the Trojan horse into the city.
- Capys, mythological king of Alba Longa and descendant of Aeneas. Said to have reigned from 963 to 935 BC.

According to Roman sources, in the Etruscan language the word capys meant "hawk" or "falcon" (or possibly "eagle" or "vulture").

Legendary titles
Preceded by Atys	King of Alba Longa	Succeeded by Capetus Silvius
