= Hersilia =

Wife of Romulus, legendary first king of Rome

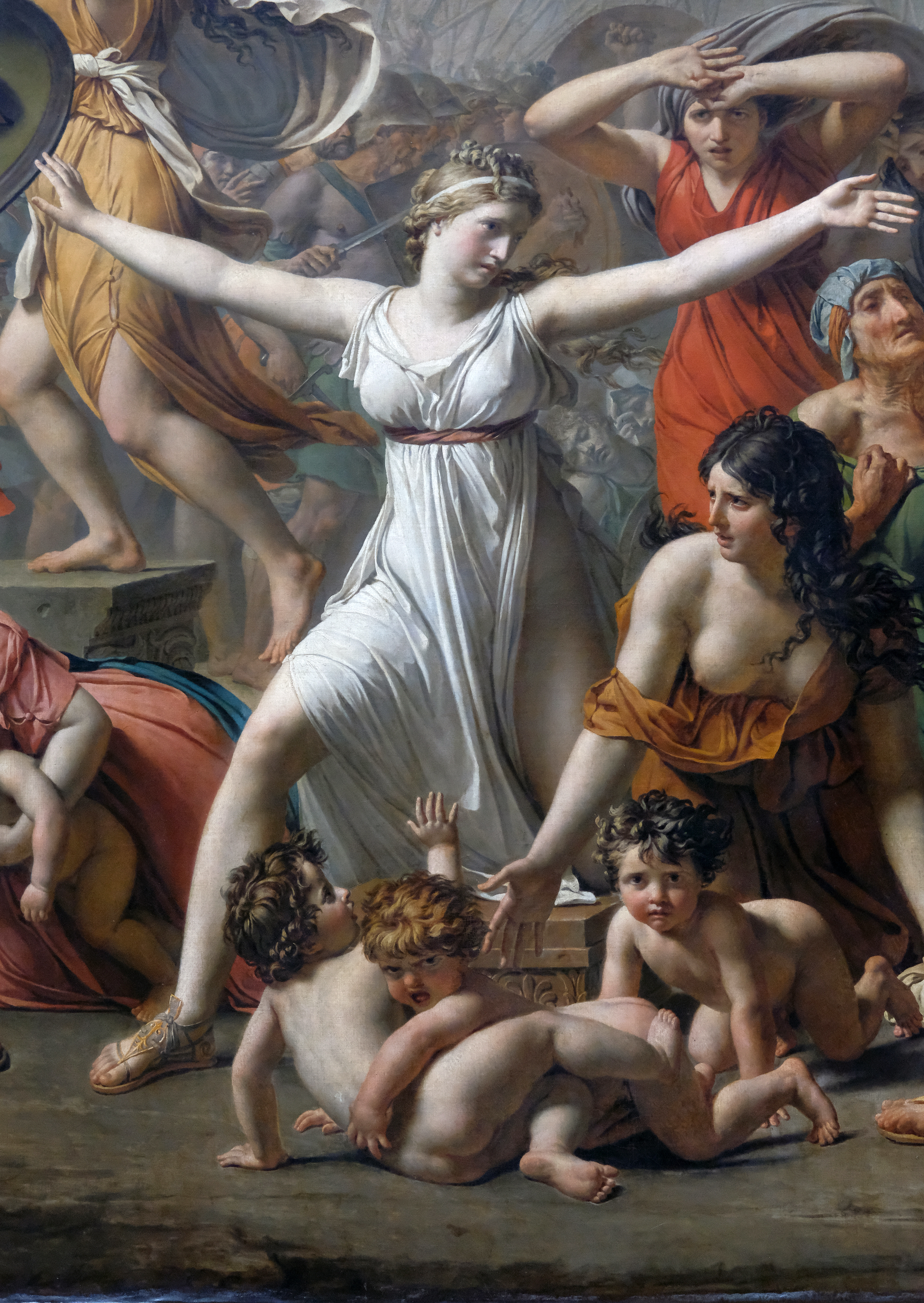
Hersilia from a detail of The Intervention of the Sabine Women, Jacques-Louis David (1799)

In Roman mythology, Hersilia was a figure in the foundation myth of Rome. She is credited with ending the war between Rome and the Sabines.

== Battle of the Lacus Curtius ==
In some accounts she is the wife of Romulus, the founder and first king of Rome in Rome's founding myths. She is described as such in both Livy and Plutarch; but in Dionysius, Macrobius, and another tradition recorded by Plutarch, she was instead the wife of Hostus Hostilius, a Roman champion at the time of Romulus. This would make her the grandmother of Tullus Hostilius, the third king of Rome.

Livy tells this tale in his work Ab urbe condita:

While the Romans were thus occupied in the City, the army of the Antemnates seized the opportunity afforded by their absence, and made an inroad upon their territory; but so swiftly was the Roman levy led against them that they, too, were taken off their guard while scattered about in the fields. They were therefore routed at the first charge and shout, and their town was taken. As Romulus was exulting in his double victory, his wife Hersilia, beset with entreaties by the captive women, begged him to forgive their parents and receive them into the state; which would, in that case, gain in strength by harmony. He readily granted her request.

Just like her husband (who became the god Quirinus), she was deified after her death as Hora Quirini, as recounted in Ovid's Metamorphoses:

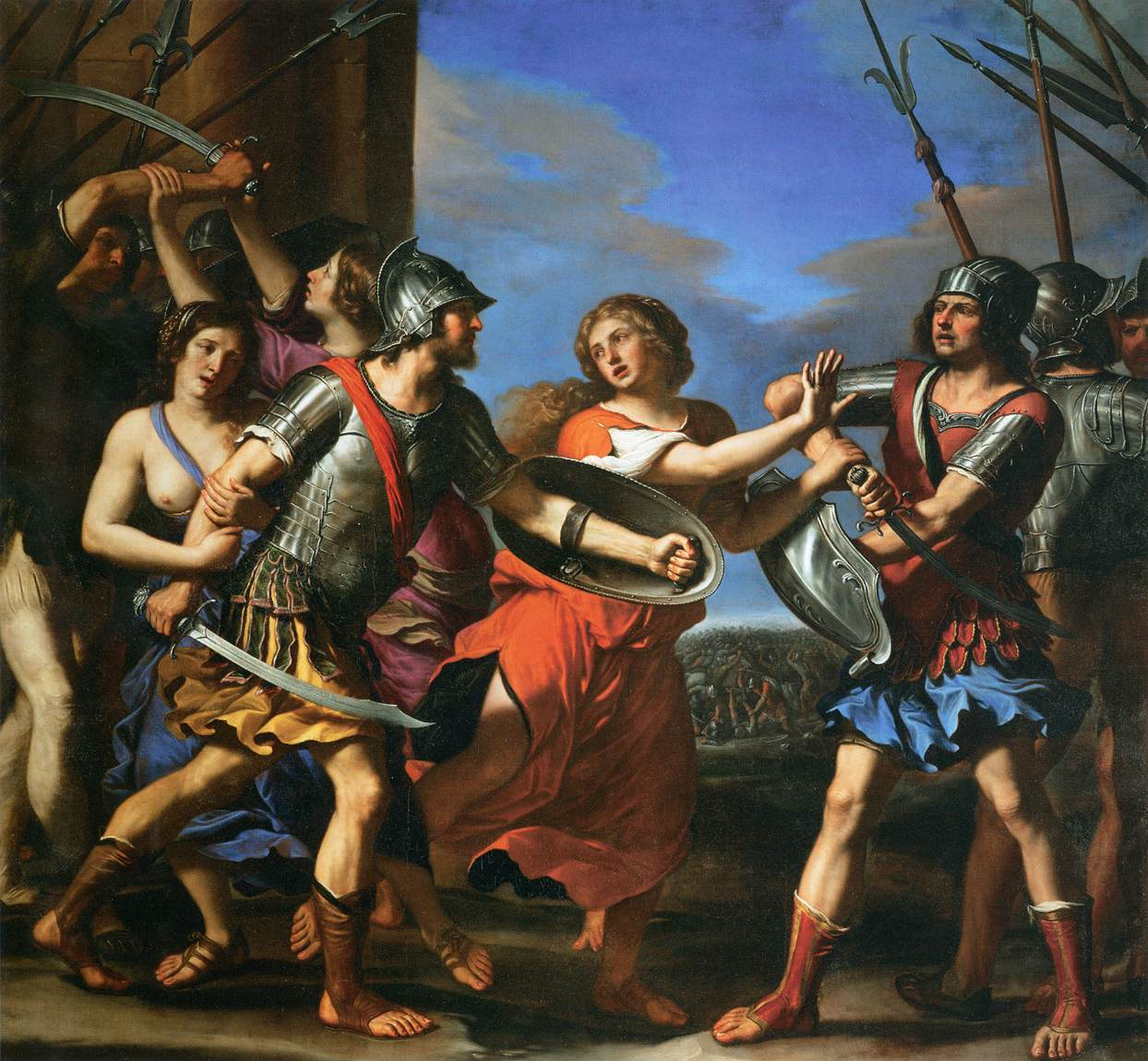
Hersilia Separating Romulus and Tatius (1645) by Guercino

His queen, Hersilia, wept continually,
regarding him as lost, till regal Juno
commanded Iris to glide down along
her curving bow and bring to her these words:

“O matron, glory of the Latin race
and of the Sabines, worthy to have been
the consort chosen by so great a man
and now to be his partner as the god
Quirinus, weep no more. If you desire
to see your husband, let me guide you up
to a grove that crowns the hill of Quirinus,
shading a temple of the Roman king.”

Iris obeyed her will, and, gliding down
to earth along her tinted bow, conveyed
the message to Hersilia; who replied,
with modest look and hardly lifted eye,
“Goddess (although it is not in my power
to say your name, I am quite certain you
must be a goddess), lead me, O lead me
until you show to me the hallowed form
of my beloved husband. If the Fates
will but permit me once again to see
his features, I will say I have won heaven.”

At once Hersilia and the virgin child
of Thaumas, went together up the hill
of Romulus. Descending through thin air
there came a star, and then Hersilia
her tresses glowing fiery in the light,
rose with that star, as it returned through air.
And her the founder of the Roman state
received with dear, familiar hands. He changed
her old time form and with the form her name.
He called her Hora and let her become
a goddess, now the mate of Quirinus.

Very little concrete information is known about the deity Hora Quirini. According to Georg Wissowa, Ovid created the story of Hersilia's apotheosis into Hora Quirini. On the other hand, T.P. Wiseman argues that the story comes from an earlier Greek source.

== See also ==
- The rape of the Sabine women
- Quirinus
