= The Rape of Ganymede =

The Rape of Ganymede, referring to the Greek god Jupiter kidnapping the handsome Ganymede and taking him to Mount Olympus, has been the subject of a number of notable paintings.

These include:

- Ganymede Abducted by the Eagle (c. 1531–1532), a painting by Antonio da Correggio
- The Rape of Ganymede (Mazza) (c. 1575), a painting by Damiano Mazza
- The Rape of Ganymede (Rembrandt) (1635), a painting by Rembrandt
- The Rape of Ganymede (Rubens) (1638–1639), a painting by Peter Paul Rubens
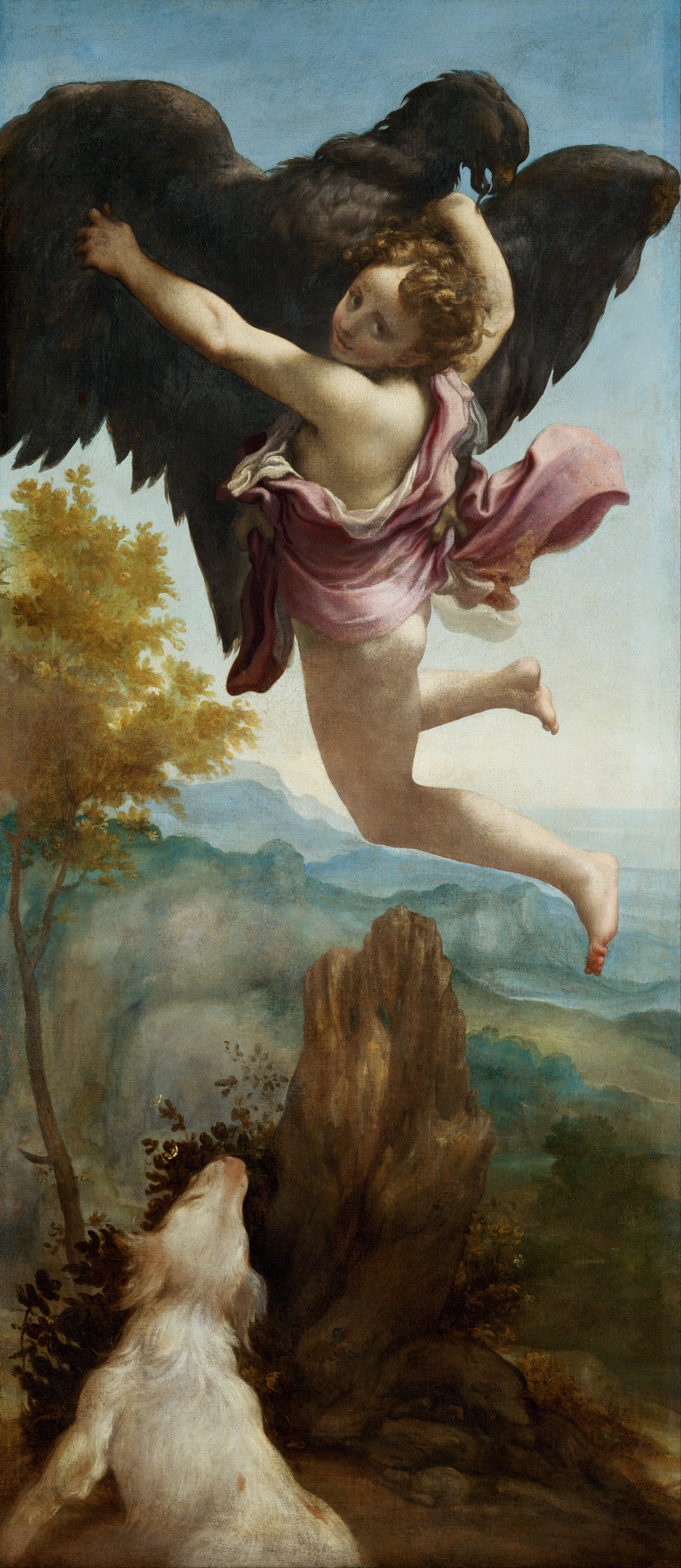
Ganymede Abducted by the Eagle

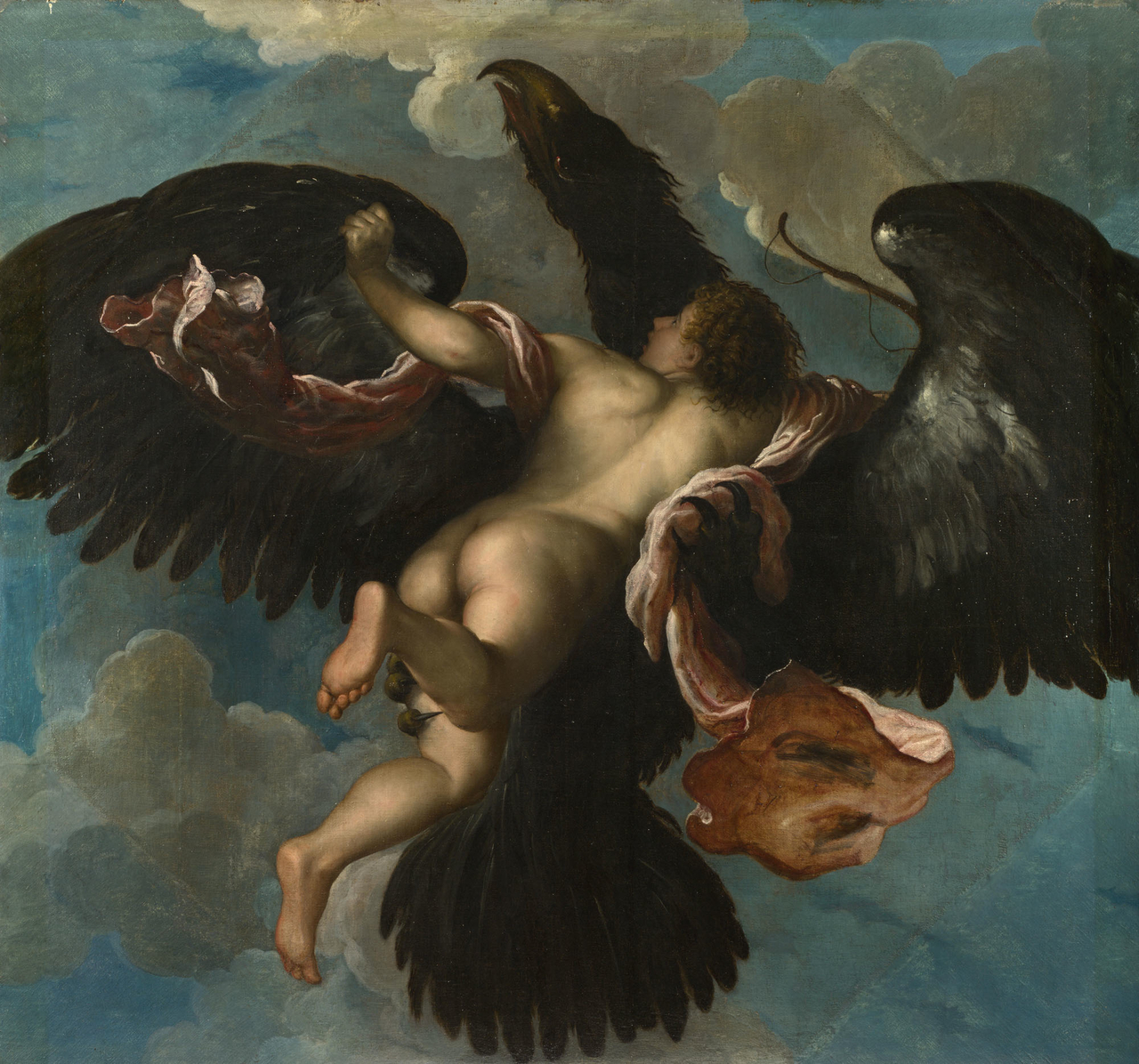
The Rape of Ganymede (Mazza)

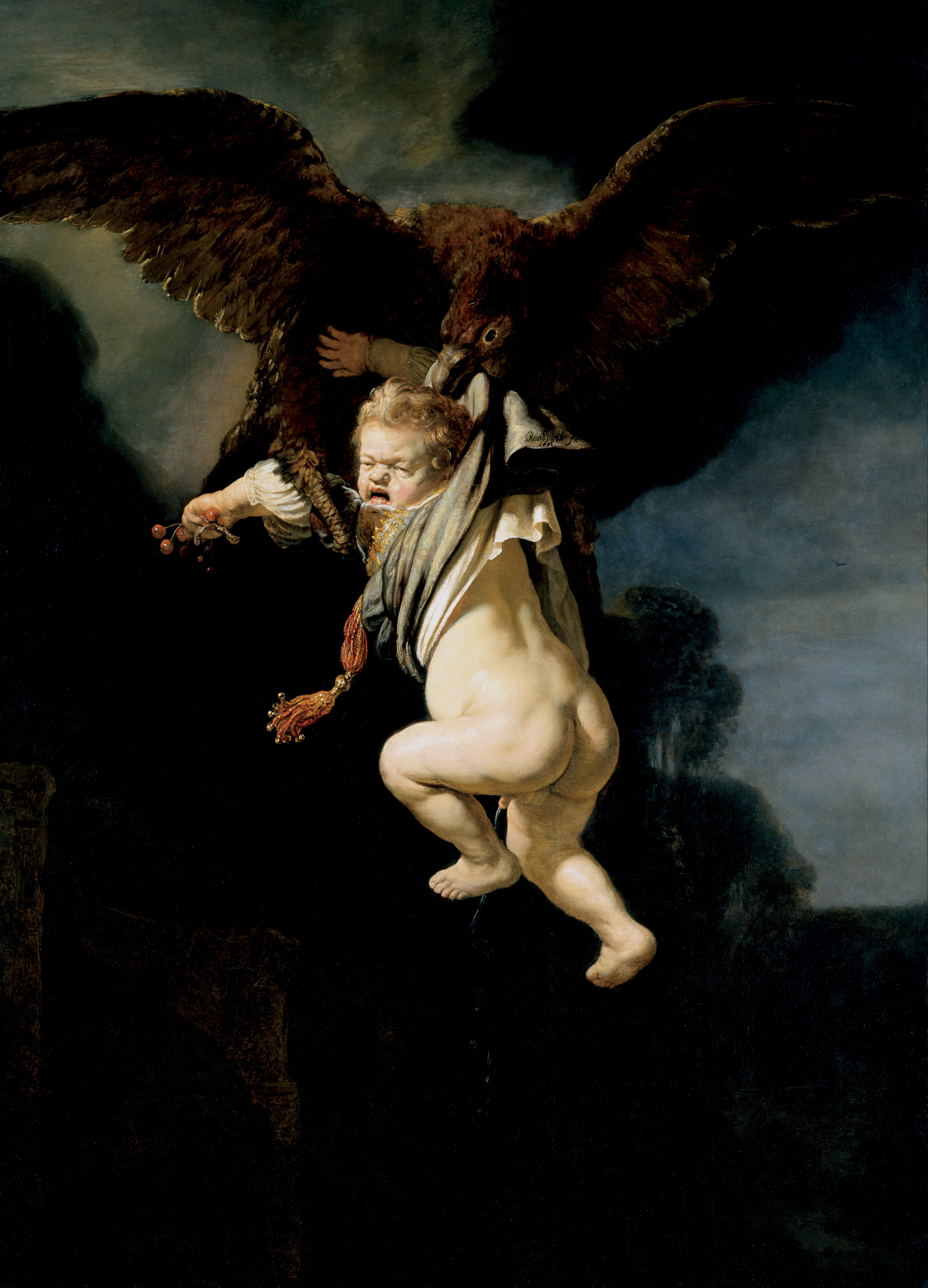
The Rape of Ganymede (Rembrandt)

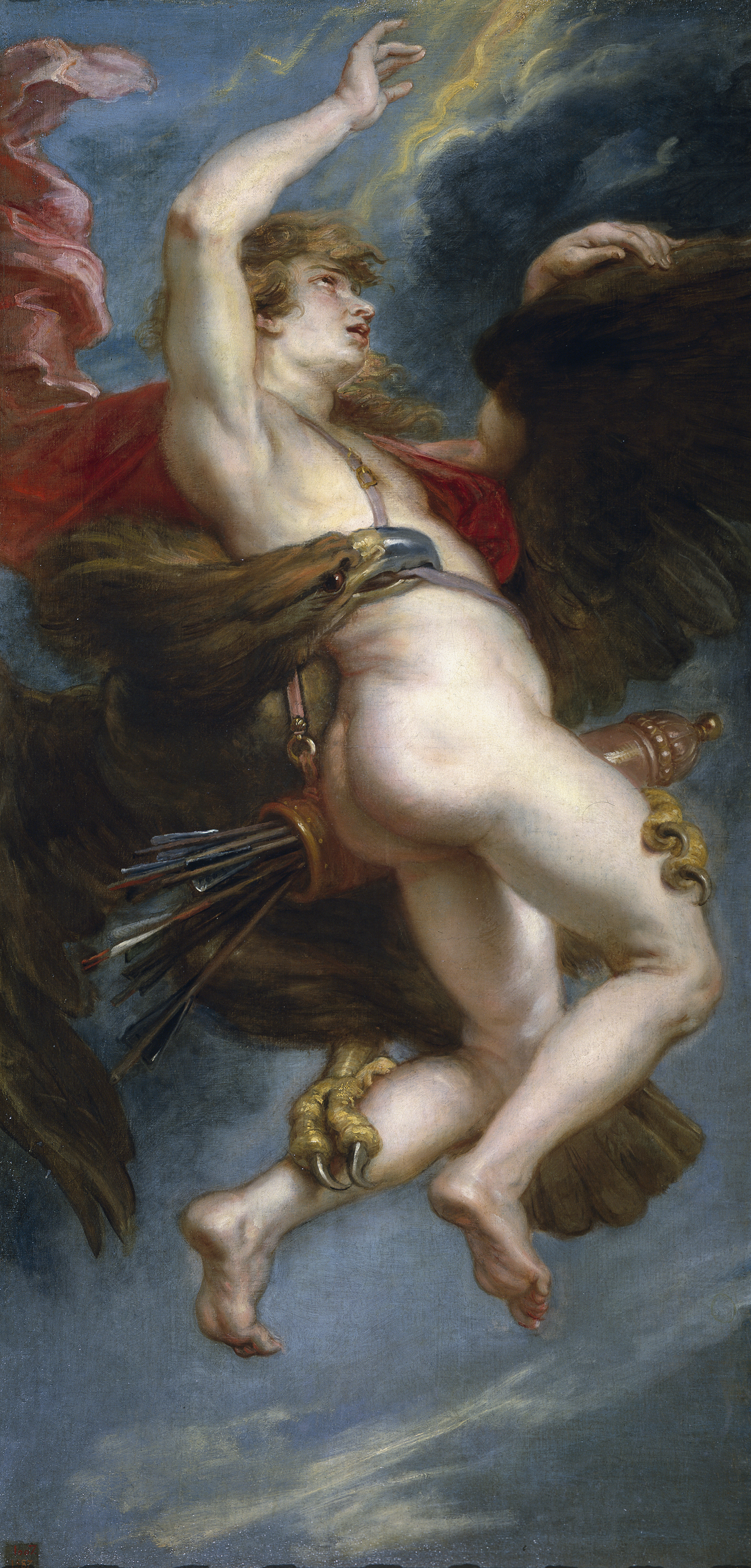
The Rape of Ganymede (Rubens)

== See also ==
- Ganymede (disambiguation)
