= Ganymede =

Ganymede most commonly refers to:

- Ganymede (mythology), Trojan prince in Greek mythology, or his nephew of the same name
- Ganymede (moon), Jupiter's largest moon, named after the mythological character

Ganymede, Ganymed or Ganymedes may also refer to:

- Ganymede (band), a 2000s American band
- Ganymed (band), a 1970s Austrian disco band
- Ganymedes (eunuch), tutor of Arsinoe IV of Egypt and adversary to Julius Caesar
- Ganymedes, a taxonomic synonym for the plant genus Narcissus
- "Ganymed" (Goethe), a poem by Goethe
- Ganymede (software), a GPL-licensed network directory management system
- 1036 Ganymed, an asteroid
- HMS Ganymede (1809), British prison hulk that was moored in Chatham Harbour, Kent, England
- USS Ganymede (AK-104), a United States Navy vessel in World War II
- Rosalind (As You Like It) or Ganymede, a character in As You Like It by William Shakespeare
- Ganymede, a Marvel Comics character

== See also ==
- Ganymede City, a term coined by Arthur C. Clarke in his science fiction novel 3001: The Final Odyssey
- Ganymede Heights, rounded ridges with extensive rock outcrops on the eastern side of Alexander Island, Antarctica
- Grahame-White Ganymede, a prototype British heavy night bomber intended to serve with the Royal Air Force in the First World War
- The Ganymede Club, a 1995 science fiction novel by American writer Charles Sheffield
- The Ganymede Takeover, a 1967 science fiction novel by American writers Philip K. Dick and Ray Nelson
- The Goddess of Ganymede, a science fiction novel by American writer Mike Resnick
- The Rape of Ganymede (disambiguation)
- Ganymedidae, a family of parasites
- Ganimedes, a horse
