= Cupid Making His Bow =

Painting by Parmigianino

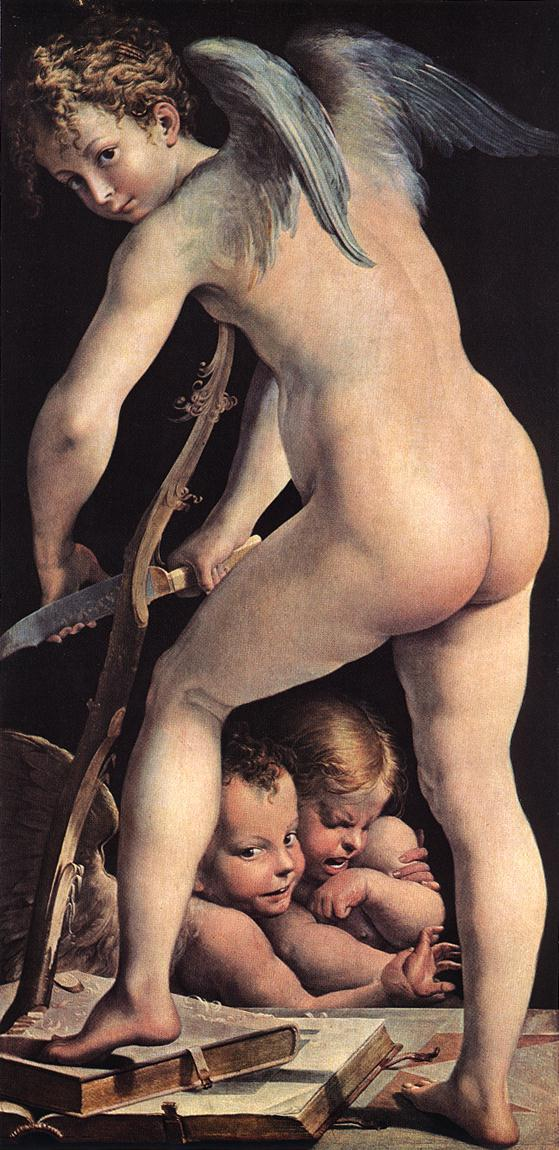
- Artist: Parmigianino
- Year: c. 1533–1535
- Medium: Oil on panel
- Dimensions: 135 cm × 65.3 cm (53 in × 25.7 in)
- Location: Kunsthistorisches Museum, Vienna

Cupid Making His Bow (c. 1533–1535) is a painting by the Italian late Renaissance artist Parmigianino. It is housed in the Kunsthistorisches Museum, Vienna, Austria.

== History ==
The work appears in the inventory of Francesco Baiardo in Parma, who was a friend and patron of Parmigianino. Late Renaissance art biographer Giorgio Vasari writes that Baiardo had commissioned the Cupido che fabbrica di sua mano un arco.

The painting was inherited by Marcantonio Cavalca and later went to Antonio Pérez, secretary of state of Philip II of Spain, who brought it with him to Spain. In 1579 Pérez fell in disgrace, and was forced to sell the painting to an envoy of emperor Rudolf II, Holy Roman Emperor. It was however blocked by the Spanish crown, and could be acquired and arrive to Prague, together with Correggio's Jupiter and Io and Ganymede Abducted by the Eagle, in 1603. It was transferred to Vienna's Schatzkammer in 1631.

A preparatory drawing for Cupid's head is in the Cabinet des Dessins of the Louvre (n. 1662). The work was frequently copied and used as a model by numerous artists. There are copies by Joseph Heintz the Elder and Rubens in the Alte Pinakothek of Munich.

== See also ==
- Ganymede Abducted by the Eagle

== Sources ==
- Viola, Luisa (2007). Parmigianino. Parma: Grafiche Step.
