= Ganymede (mythology) =

Figure from Greek mythology

- Cupbearer to the gods
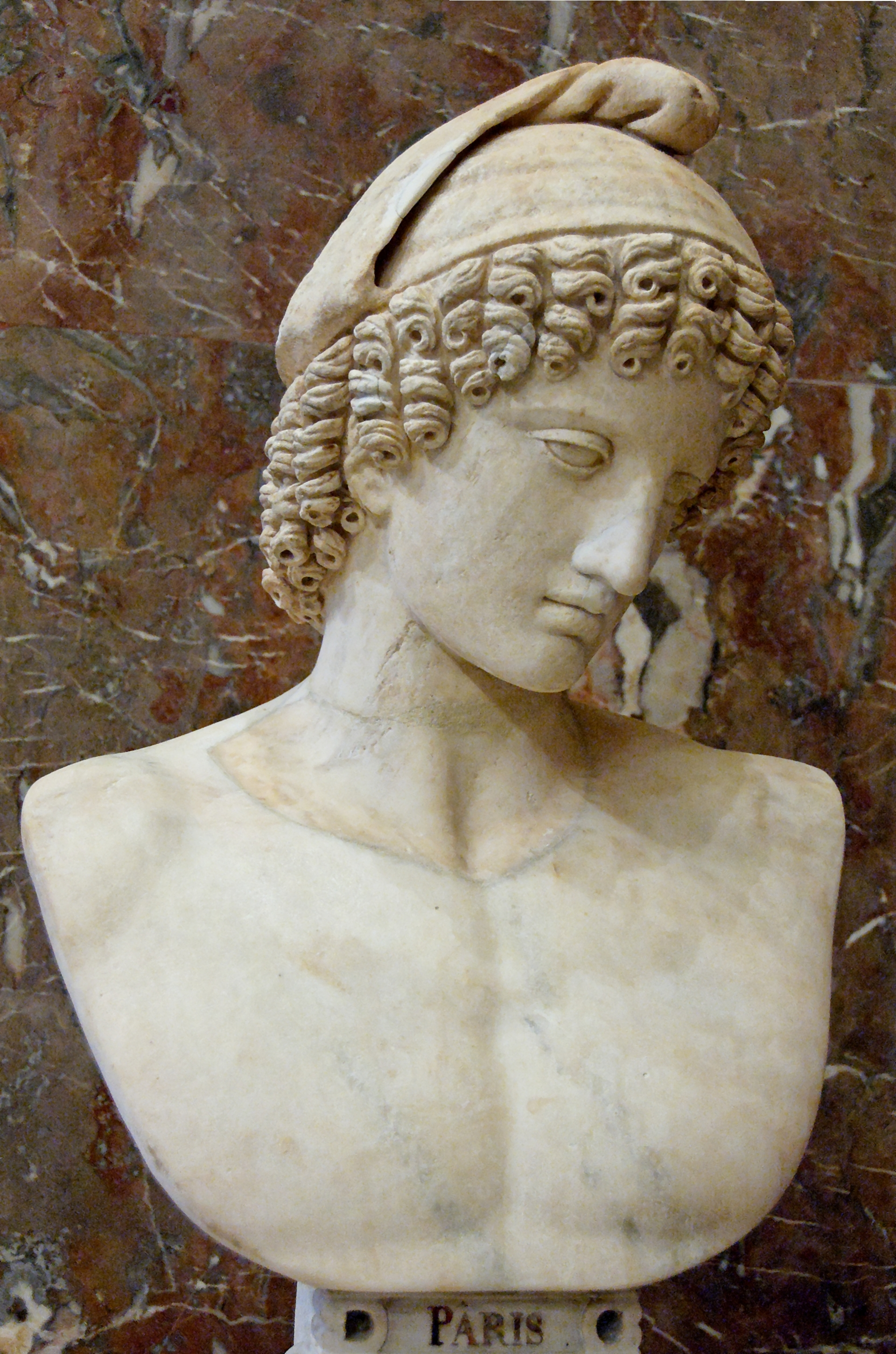
- Roman marble bust depicting Ganymede, dating to the 2nd century, now at the Louvre
- Abode: Mount Olympus

Genealogy
- Parents: Tros and Callirhoe or Acallaris
- Siblings: Ilus, Assaracus, Cleopatra, Cleomestra

In Greek mythology, Ganymede (/ˈɡænɪmiːd/ GAN-im-eed) or Ganymedes (/ˌɡænɪˈmiːdiːz/ GAN-im-EE-deez; Ancient Greek: Γανυμήδης, romanized: Ganymēdēs) is a divine hero whose homeland was Troy. Homer describes Ganymede as the most handsome of mortals and tells the story of how he was abducted by the gods to serve as Zeus's cup-bearer in Olympus. While classical traditions follow this narrative, a different account by Dictys Cretensis instead states that Ganymede was abducted by the Cretans. The Latin form of his name was Catamitus (and also "Ganymedes"), from which the English word catamite is derived.

While the earliest forms of the myth have no erotic content, by the 5th century BCE it was believed that Zeus had a sexual passion for him. Socrates says that Zeus was in love with Ganymede, called "desire" in Plato's Phaedrus; but in Xenophon's Symposium, Socrates argues Zeus loved him for his mind and their relationship was not sexual.

== Family ==
In Greek mythology, Ganymede is the son of Tros of Dardania, from whose name "Troy" is supposedly derived, either by his wife Callirrhoe, daughter of the river god Scamander, or Acallaris, daughter of Eumedes. Depending on the author, he is the brother of either Ilus, Assaracus, Cleopatra, or Cleomestra.

Other details about Ganymede differ as well. Some authors called him a son of Laomedon while others called him a son of Ilus. He is also known in stories as Dardanus, Erichthonius, or Assaracus.

According to Edmund Veckenstedt, Ganymede was an ethnic Semite, along with his brothers Ilus and Assarakos.

Comparative table of Ganymede's family
Relation	Names	Sources											
Relation	Names	Homer	Homeric Hymns	Euripides	Diodorus	Cicero	Dionysius	Apollodorus	Hyginus	Dictys	Clement	Suda	Tzetzes
Parentage	Tros ♂	✓	✓		✓		✓	✓		✓		✓	
Parentage	Acallaris ♀						✓						
Parentage	Callirhoe ♀							✓					
Parentage	Laomedon ♂			✓		✓							
Parentage	Erichthonius ♂								✓				
Parentage	Assaracus ♂								✓				
Parentage	Dardanus ♂										✓		
Parentage	Ilus ♂												✓
Siblings	Ilus	✓			✓			✓		✓		✓	
Siblings	Assaracus	✓			✓			✓				✓	
Siblings	Cleopatra							✓					
Siblings	Cleomestra									✓			

== Mythology ==
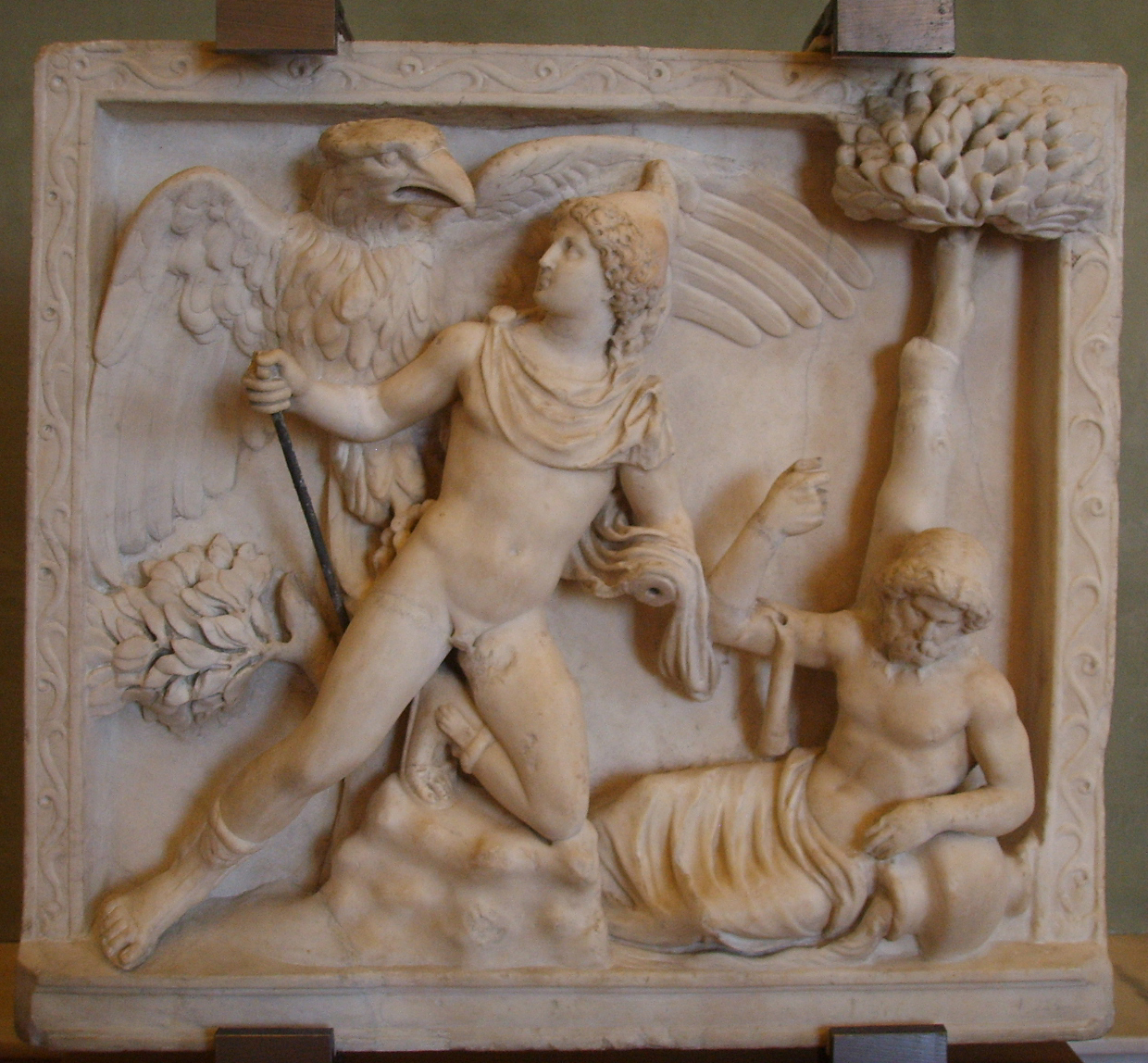
Roman-era relief depicting the eagle of Zeus abducting Ganymede, his Phrygian cap denoting an eastern origin, and a river god

Ganymede's abduction is referenced in the Iliad (c. 750–700 BC), which describes his beauty as exceeding that of all other mortals. Because of his beauty, he was kidnapped by the gods, becoming Zeus's wine-pourer. The Iliad contains no explicit suggestion of an erotic relationship between Ganymede and Zeus, nor does the Homeric Hymn to Aphrodite, in which Zeus alone performs the abduction. The earliest writer to unambiguously describe the relationship as erotic is Theognis (c. 6th century BC). In some later sources, Ganymede was abducted by Zeus from Mount Ida near Troy in Phrygia. Ganymede had been tending sheep, a rustic or humble pursuit characteristic of a hero's boyhood before his privileged status is revealed, when an eagle transported the youth to Mount Olympus. The bird is sometimes described as being under the command of Zeus and sometimes as being Zeus himself. In Homer's account of the abduction in the Iliad, the poet writes:

[Ganymedes] was the loveliest born of the race of mortals, and therefore
the gods caught him away to themselves, to be Zeus' wine-pourer,
for the sake of his beauty, so he might be among the immortals.

— Homer, Iliad, Book XX, lines 233–235.

On Olympus, Zeus granted Ganymede eternal youth and immortality as the official cup bearer to the gods, in place of Hebe, who was relieved of cup-bearing duties upon her marriage to Herakles. Alternatively, the Iliad presented Hebe (and at one instance, Hephaestus) as the cup bearer of the Olympians in general, with Ganymede acting as Zeus's personal cup bearer. Edmund Veckenstedt associated Ganymede with the creation of mead, which had a traditional origin in Phrygia. In various literature such as the Aeneid, Hera, Zeus's wife, regards Ganymede as a rival for her husband's affection. In various stories, Zeus later put Ganymede in the sky as the constellation Aquarius (the "water-carrier" or "cup-carrier"), which is adjacent to Aquila (the Eagle). The identification of Aquarius with Ganymede was the most common interpretation of the constellation in Greek literature, appearing in the Catasterismi, De astronomia, and the Fabulae. In recognition of this myth, the largest moon of the planet Jupiter (named after Zeus's Roman counterpart) was named Ganymede by the German astronomer Simon Marius.

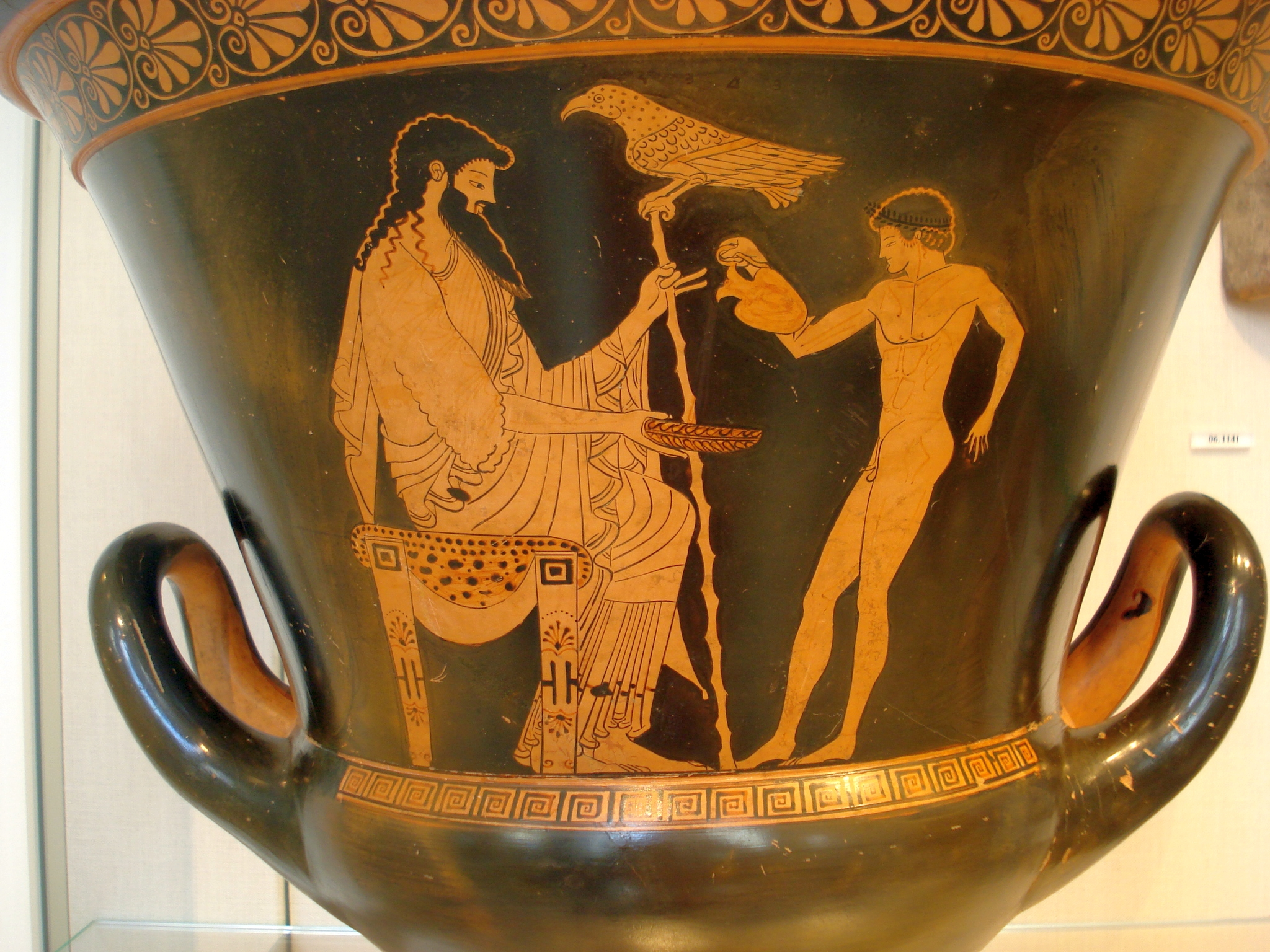
Ganymede pouring Zeus a libation (Attic red-figure calyx krater by the Eucharides Painter, c. 490–480 BCE)

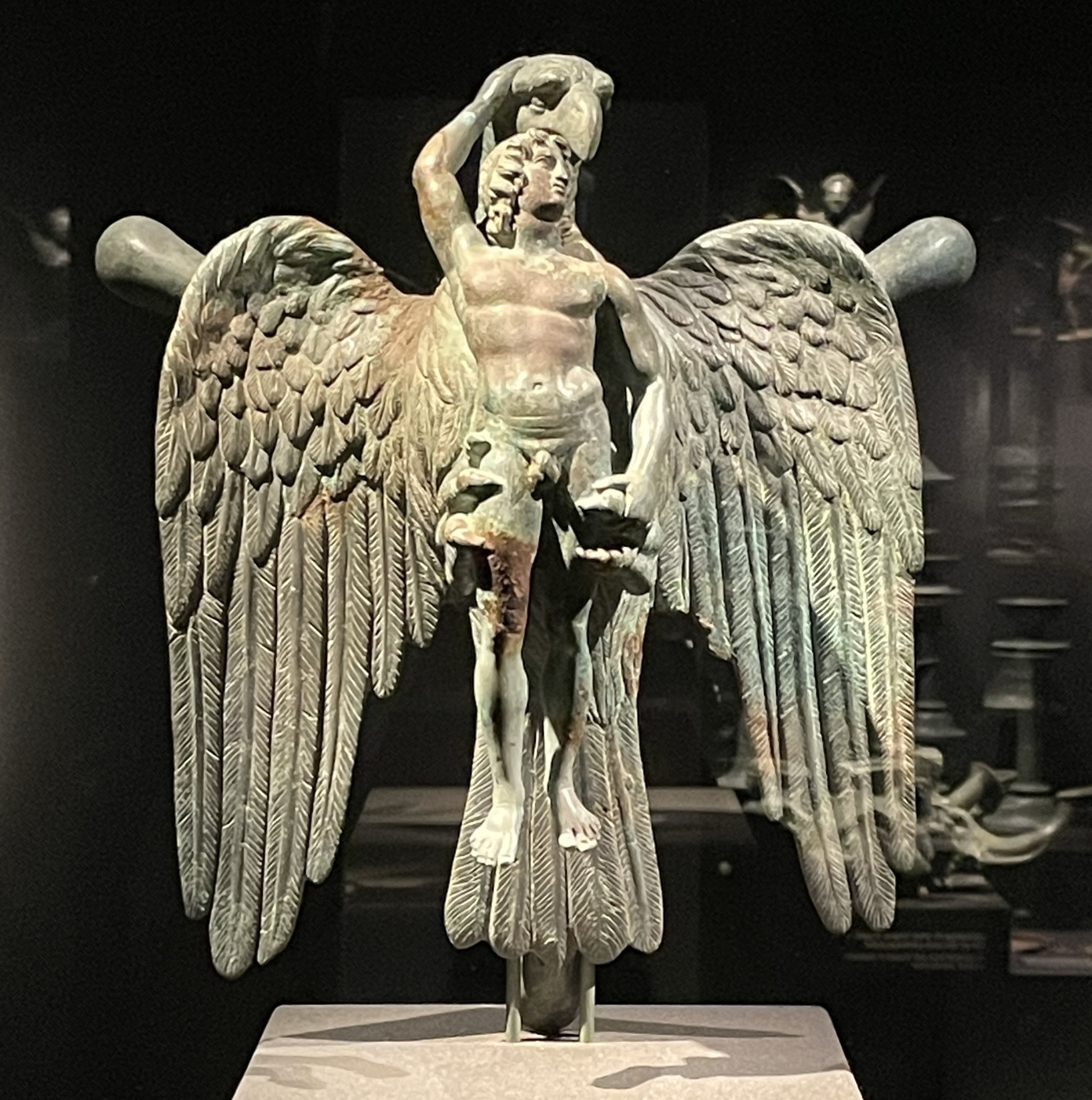
Bronze lamp featuring Zeus and Ganymede from western Georgia, c. 3rd century BC, Georgian National Museum

In the Iliad and other sources, Zeus is said to have compensated Ganymede's father Tros with the gift of a pair of fine horses, "the same that carry the immortals" and so swift they could run "over water and standing airs of grain", delivered by the messenger god Hermes. Tros was consoled that his son was now immortal and would be the cupbearer for the gods, a position of much distinction.

Plato accounts for the pederastic aspect of the myth by attributing its origin to Crete, where the social custom of paiderastía was supposed to have originated (see "Cretan pederasty"). Athenaeus recorded a version of the myth where Ganymede was lusted and abducted not by Zeus but instead by the legendary King Minos to serve as his cup-bearer. Some authors have equated this version of the myth to Cretan pederasty practices, as recorded by Strabo and Ephoros, which involved abduction of a youth by an older lover for a period of two months before the youth was able to re-enter society as a man. Still, Xenophon portrays Socrates denying that Ganymede was the catamite of Zeus, instead asserting that the god loved him for his psychē, "mind" or "soul", giving the etymology of his name as γάνυται gắnŭtai, “he is glad”, third person conjugation of γᾰ́νῠμαι, gắnŭmai, "to be glad", and μήδεᾰ, mḗdeă, “plans, thought, counsel”. Xenophon's Socrates also points out that Zeus did not grant any of his lovers immortality, but that he did grant immortality to Ganymede. However, as μήδεᾰ, mḗdeă also stands for "male genitals", author Christine Downing notes an alternative reading of the name as "happy genitals" alluding to the homoerotic aspect of the myth and Ganymede's relationship with Zeus.

In poetry, Ganymede became a symbol for the beautiful young male who attracted homosexual desire and love. He is not always portrayed as acquiescent. However, in the Argonautica of Apollonius of Rhodes, Ganymede is furious at the god Eros for having cheated him at the game of chance played with knucklebones, and Aphrodite scolds her son for "cheating a beginner". The Augustan poet Virgil portrays the abduction with pathos: the boy's aged tutors try in vain to draw him back to Earth, and his hounds bay uselessly at the sky. The loyal hounds left calling after their abducted master is a frequent motif in visual depictions and is referenced by Statius:

Here the Phrygian hunter is borne aloft on tawny wings, Gargara's range sinks downwards as he rises, and Troy grows dim beneath him; sadly stand his comrades; vainly the hounds weary their throats with barking, pursue his shadow or bay at the clouds.

== In the arts ==
=== Ancient visual arts ===
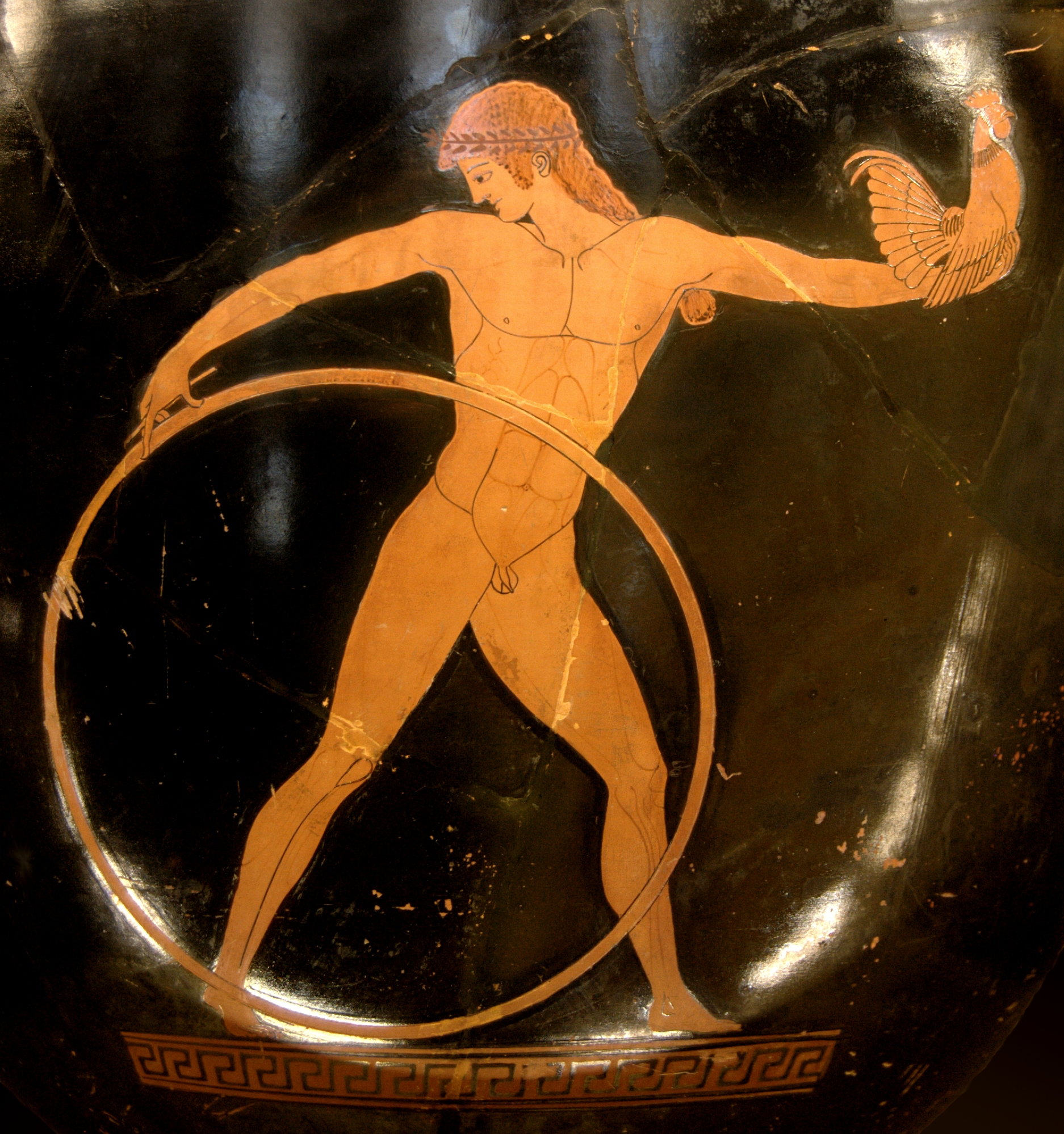
Ganymede rolling a hoop and bearing aloft a cockerel, a love-gift from Zeus, who is pictured in pursuit on the obverse of a vase by the Berlin Painter (Attic red-figure krater, 500–490 BCE)

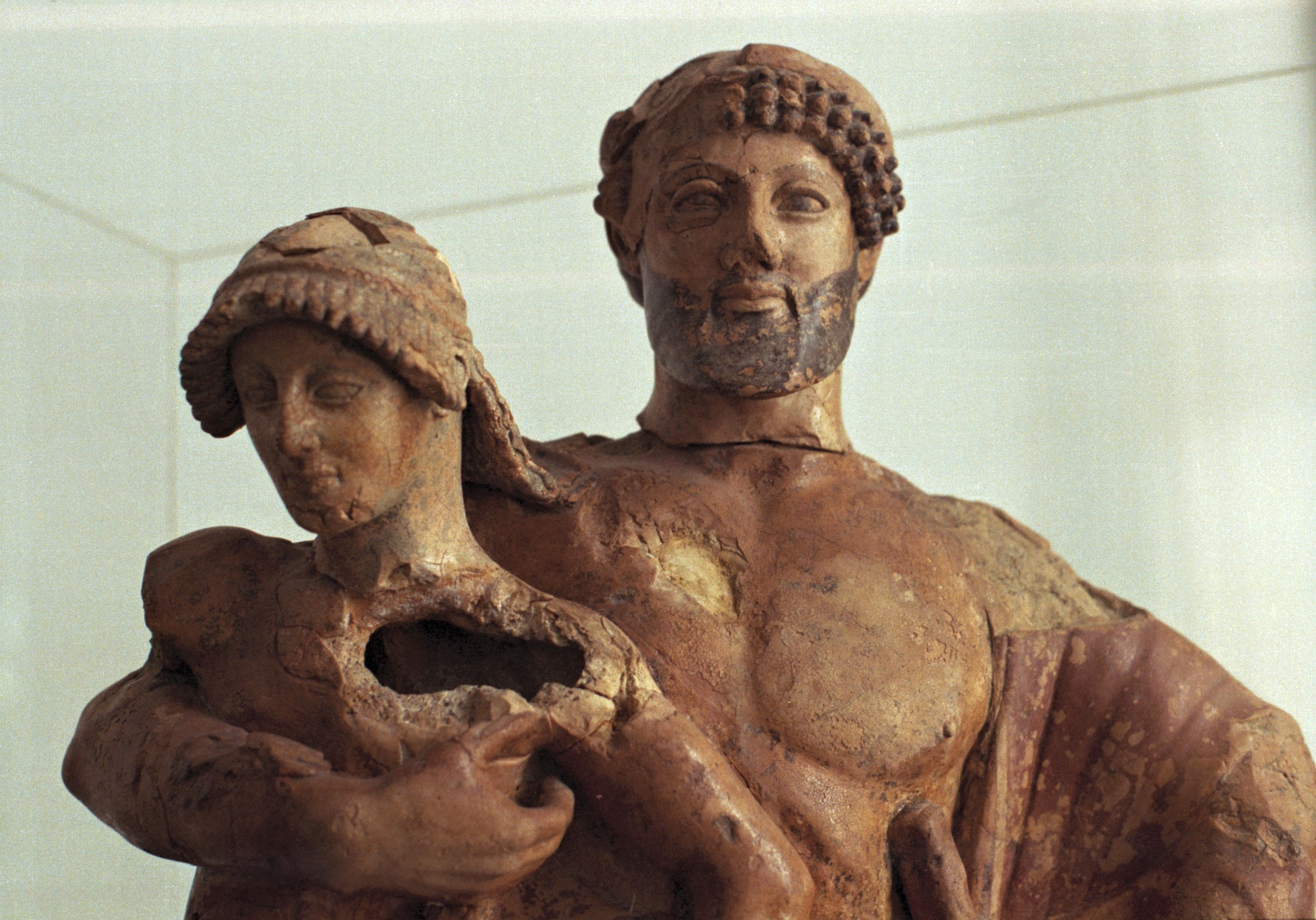
Zeus carrying away Ganymede (Late Archaic terracotta, 480–470 BC)

In 5th-century Athens, the story of Ganymede became popular among vase-painters, which was suited to the all-male symposium. Ganymede was usually depicted as a muscular young man, although Greek and Roman sculpture typically depicted his physique as less developed than athletes'.

One of the earliest depictions of Ganymede is a red-figure krater by the Berlin Painter in the Musée du Louvre. Zeus pursues Ganymede on one side, while the youth runs away on the other side, rolling along a hoop while holding aloft a crowing cock. The Ganymede myth was depicted in recognizable contemporary terms, illustrated with common behavior of homoerotic courtship rituals, as on a vase by the "Achilles Painter" where Ganymede also flees with a cock. Cocks were common gifts from older male suitors to younger men they were interested in romantically in 5th-century Athens. Leochares (c. 350 BCE), a Greek sculptor of Athens who was engaged with Scopas on the Mausoleum at Halicarnassus, cast a lost bronze group of Ganymede and the Eagle, a work that was held remarkable for its ingenious composition. It is apparently copied in a well-known marble group in the Vatican. Such Hellenistic gravity-defying feats were influential in the sculpture of the Baroque.

Ganymede and Zeus in the guise of an eagle were a popular subject on Roman funerary monuments with at least 16 sarcophagi depicting this scene.

The Carthage Paleo-Christian Museum has a fifth-century Roman statue of Ganymede.

=== Renaissance and Baroque ===
Ganymede was a major symbol of homosexual love in the visual and literary arts from the Renaissance until the Late Victorian era, when Antinous, the lover of the Roman Emperor Hadrian, became a more popular subject.

In Shakespeare's As You Like It (1599), a comedy about misunderstandings in the magical setting of the Forest of Arden, Celia, dressed as a shepherdess, becomes "Aliena" (Latin for "stranger", Ganymede's sister) and Rosalind, because she is "more than common tall", dresses up as a boy, Ganymede, a well-known image to the audience. She plays on her ambiguous charm to seduce Orlando, but also (inadvertently) the shepherdess Phoebe. Thus behind the conventions of Elizabethan theater in its original setting, the young boy played the girl Rosalind who dresses up as a boy and is then courted by another boy playing Phoebe. Ganymede also appears in the opening of Christopher Marlowe's play Dido, Queen of Carthage, where his and Zeus's affectionate banter is interrupted by an angry Aphrodite (Venus). In the later Jacobean tragedy Women Beware Women by Thomas Middleton, Ganymede, Hebe, and Hymen briefly appear to serve as cup bearers to the court, one of which has been poisoned in an assassination attempt, although the plan goes awry.

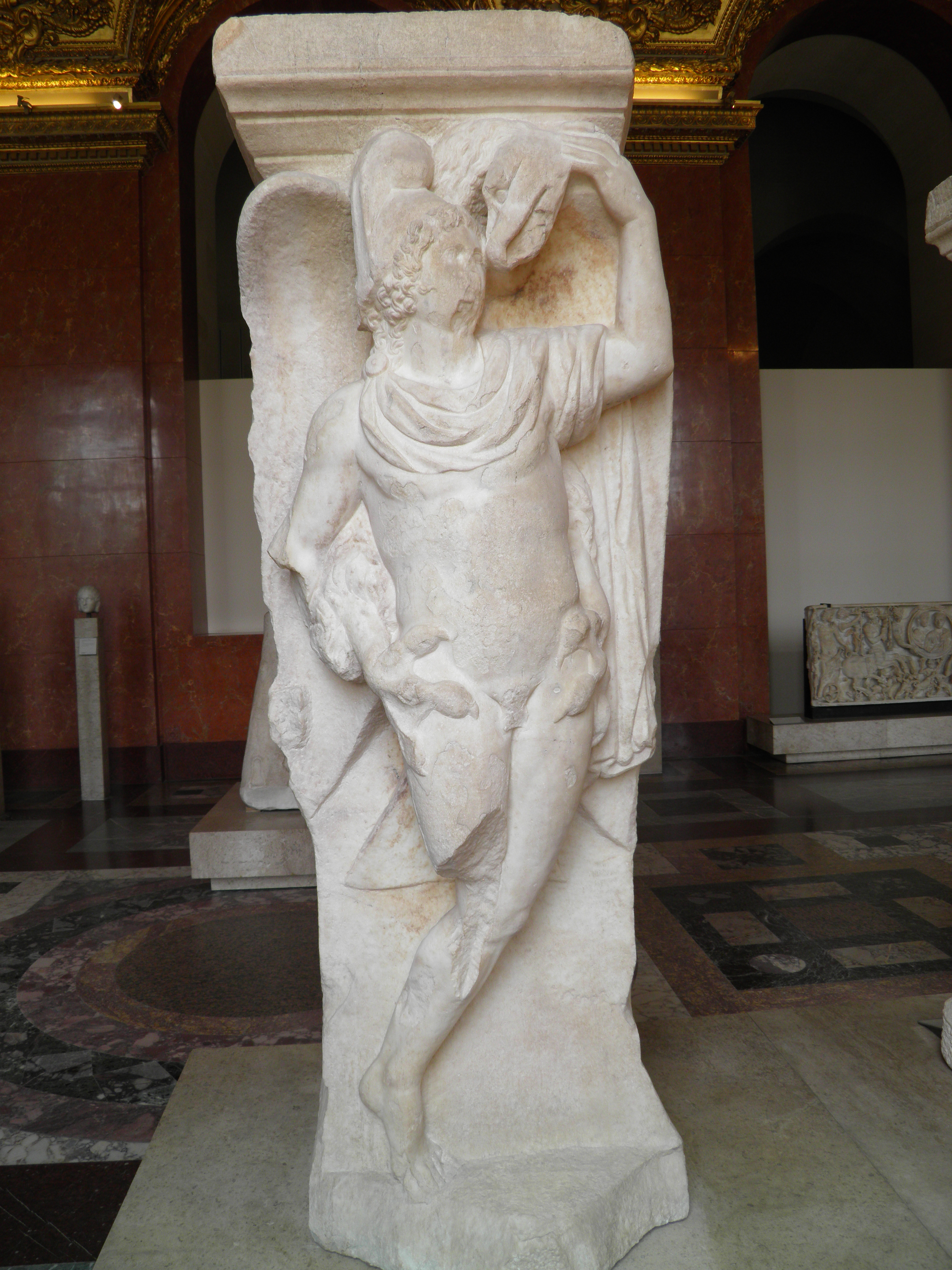
Ganymede column of Las Incantadas, in the Louvre.

Allusions to Ganymede occur with some frequency in 17th-century Spanish theater. In El castigo sin venganza (1631) by Lope de Vega, Federico, the son of the Duke of Mantua, rescues Casandra, his future stepmother, and the pair will later develop an incestuous relationship. To emphasize the non-normative relation, the work includes a long passage, possibly an ekphrasis derived from Italian art, in which Jupiter in the form of an eagle abducts Ganymede. Two plays by Tirso de Molina, in particular La prudencia en la mujer, include intriguing references to Ganymede. In this particular play, a Jewish doctor who seeks to poison the future king, carries a cup which is compared to Ganymede's.

One of the earliest surviving non-ancient depictions of Ganymede is a woodcut from the first edition of Emblemata (c. 1531), which shows the youth riding the eagle as opposed to being carried away. However, this composition is uncommon, with only sketches by Michelangelo that survived depicting Ganymede being carried. The painter-architect Baldassare Peruzzi included a panel of The Rape of Ganymede in a ceiling at the Villa Farnesina, Rome, (c. 1509–1514), with Ganymede's long blond hair and girlish pose making him identifiable at first glance, grasping the eagle's wing without resistance. In Antonio Allegri Correggio's Ganymede Abducted by the Eagle (Vienna) Ganymede's grasp is more intimate. Rubens painted two well-known versions, the earlier dating to 1611–1612 (Fürstlich Schwarzenbergische Kunststiftung, on permanent loan to the Liechtenstein Museum), portrays the young Ganymede in the embrace of the eagle being handed his cup, while a later version dating to 1636–1638, painted for the Spanish king's hunting lodge (Museo del Prado), shows the young man being swept up violently by the eagle. Johann Wilhelm Baur portrays a full-grown Ganymede confidently riding the eagle towards Olympus in Ganymede Triumphant (c. 1640s). On the other hand, when Rembrandt painted The Rape of Ganymede for a Dutch Calvinist patron in 1635, a dark eagle carries aloft a plump cherubic baby (Paintings Gallery, Dresden) who is bawling and urinating in fright. A 1685 statue of Ganymede and Zeus entitled Ganymède Médicis by Pierre Laviron stands in the gardens of Versailles.

Examples of Ganymede in 18th-century France have been studied by Michael Preston Worley. The image of Ganymede was always that of a naive adolescent accompanied by an eagle, and the homoerotic aspects of the legend were rarely dealt with. In fact, the story was often more sexualized. The Neoplatonic interpretation of the myth, also common in the Italian Renaissance, the rape of Ganymede, represented the ascent to spiritual perfection. These however seemed to be of no interest to Enlightenment philosophers and mythographers. Jean-Baptiste Marie Pierre, Charles-Joseph Natoire, Guillaume II Coustou, Pierre Julien, Jean-Baptiste Regnault and others contributed images of Ganymede to French art during this period.

== Gallery ==
Ganymede in Renaissance and Baroque art

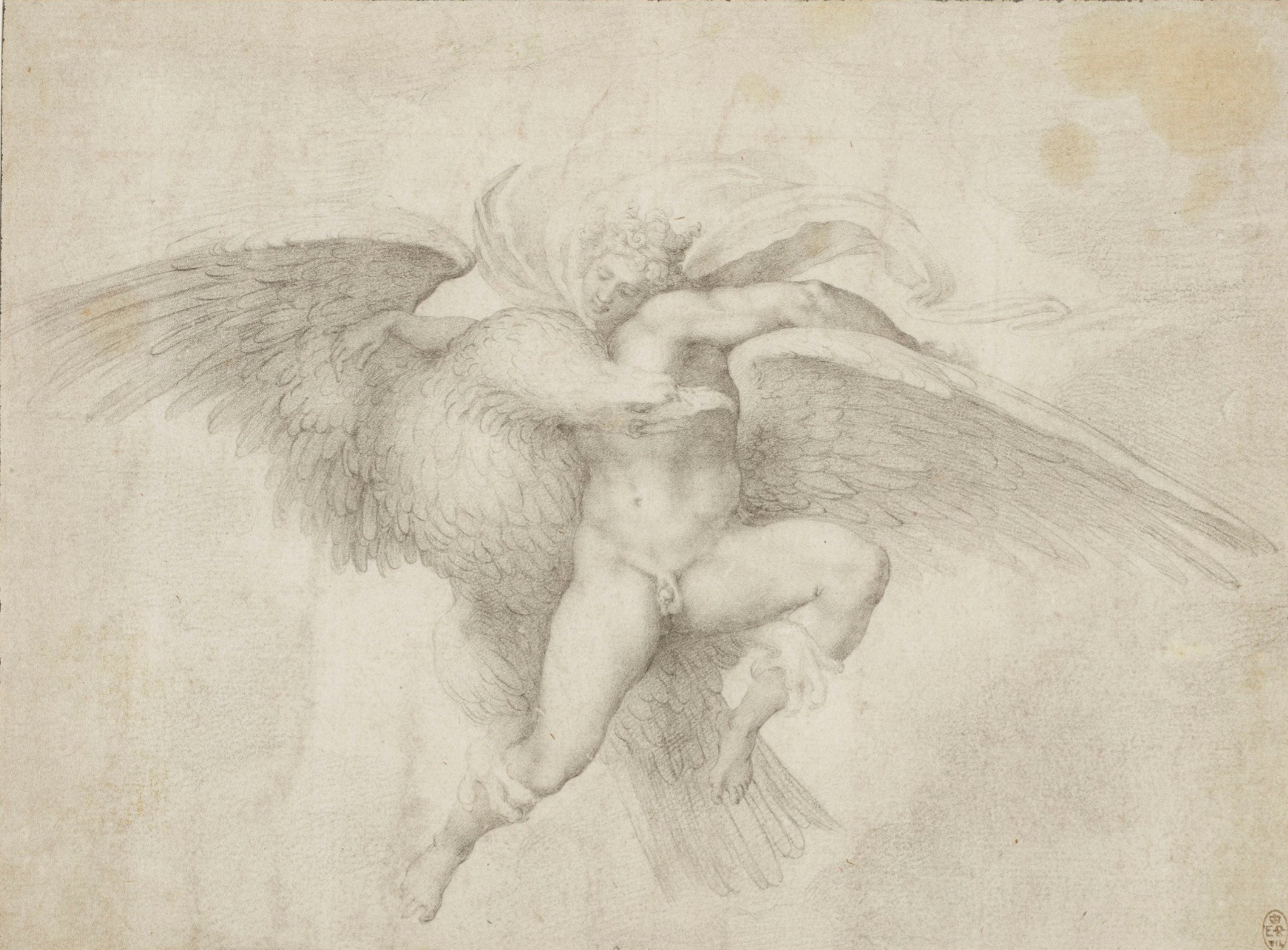
Michelangelo's Ganymede. Copy after a lost original (1532) pencil. Royal Collection, Windsor Castle

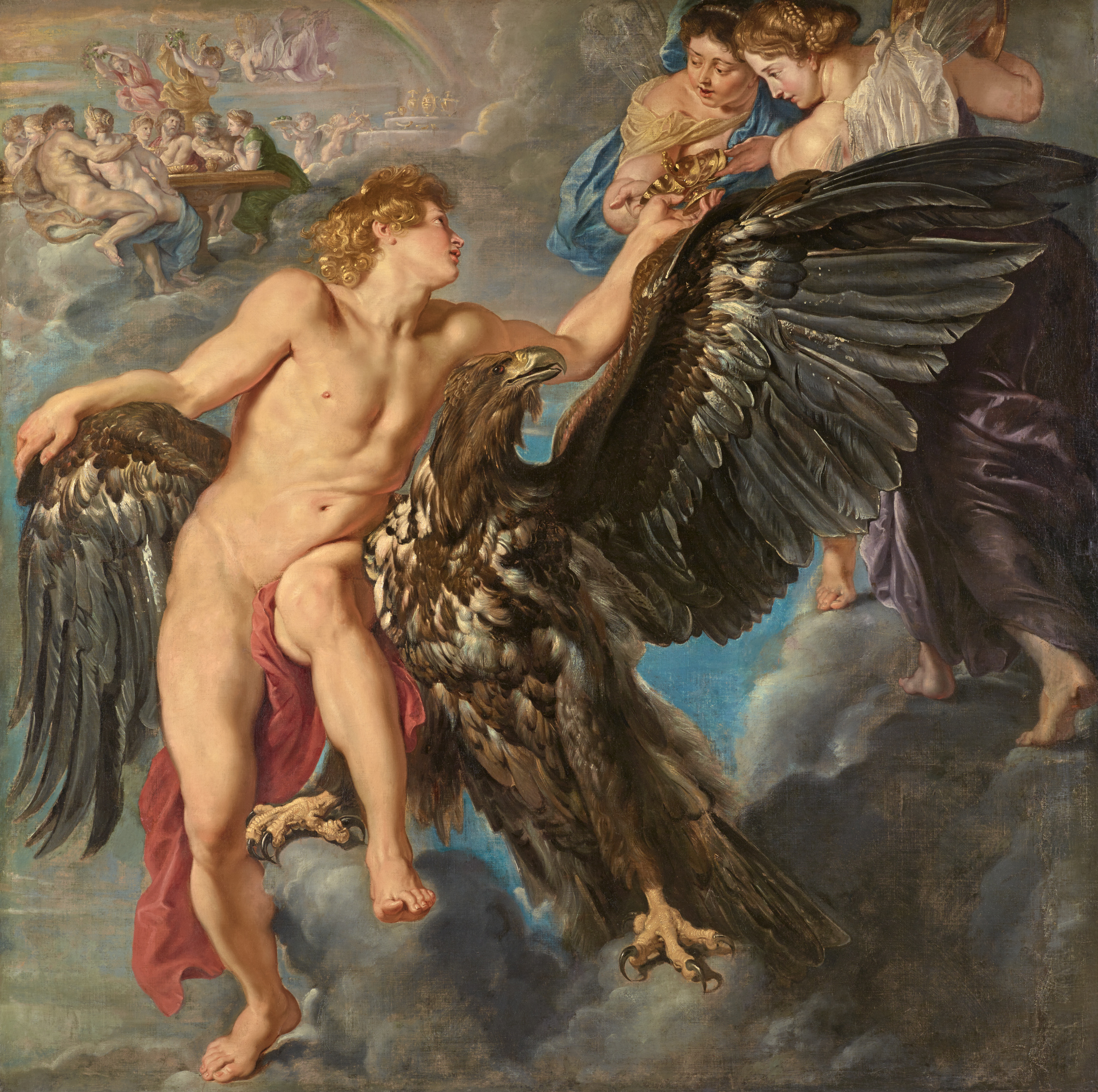
The Rape of Ganymede (1611–1612) by Rubens, Liechtenstein Museum

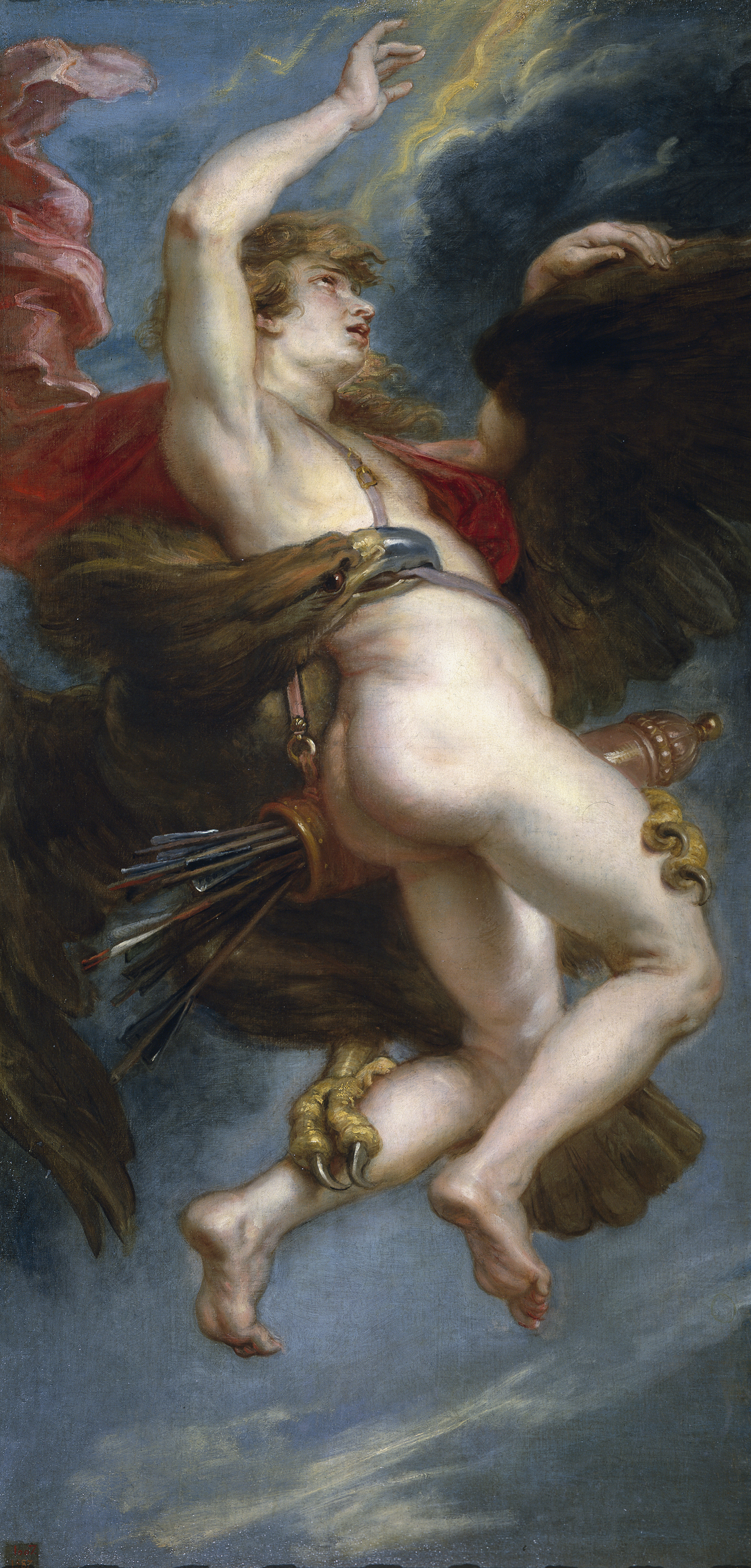
The Rape of Ganymede (1636–1638) by Rubens, Prado

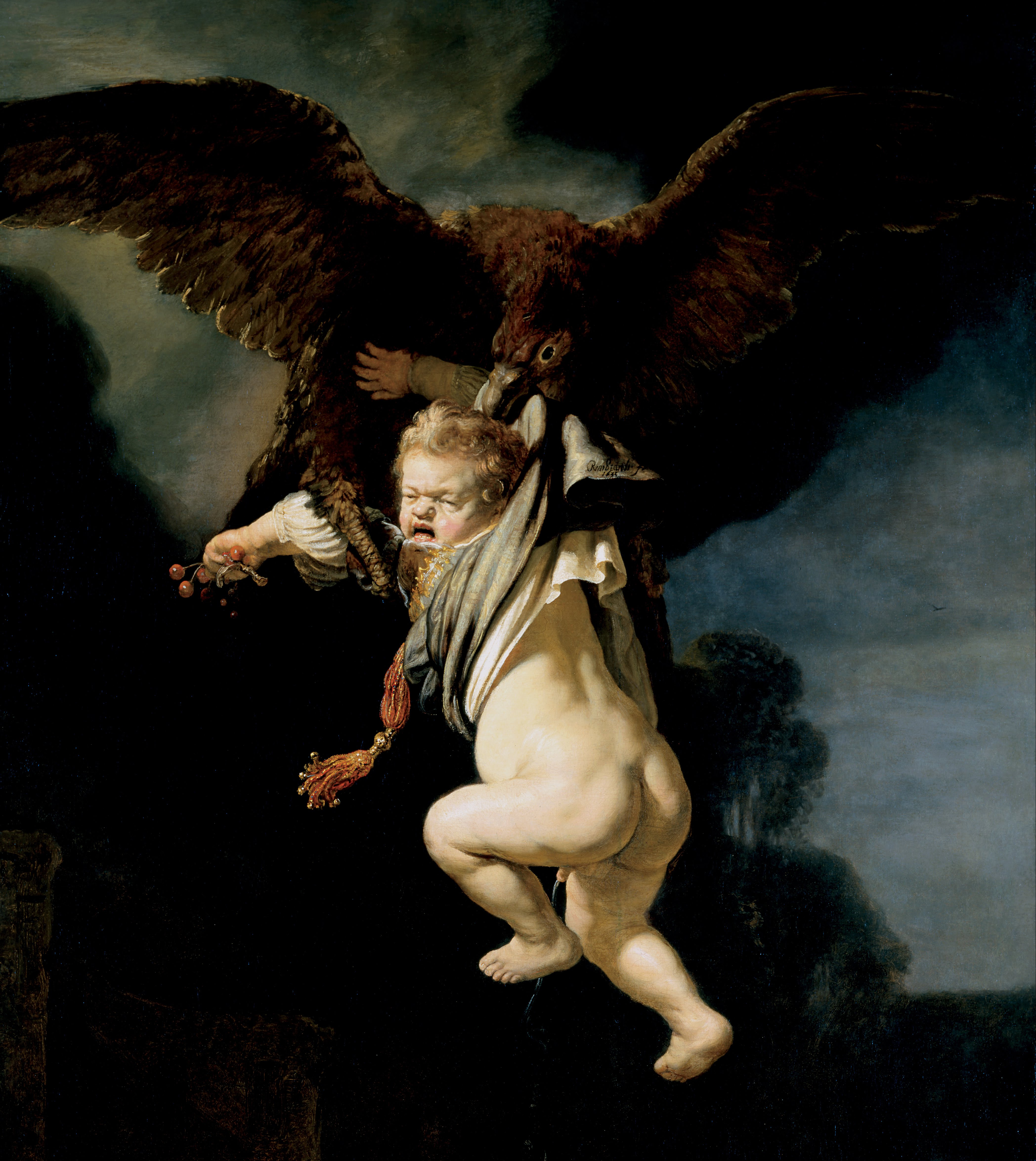
The Rape of Ganymede (1635) by Rembrandt

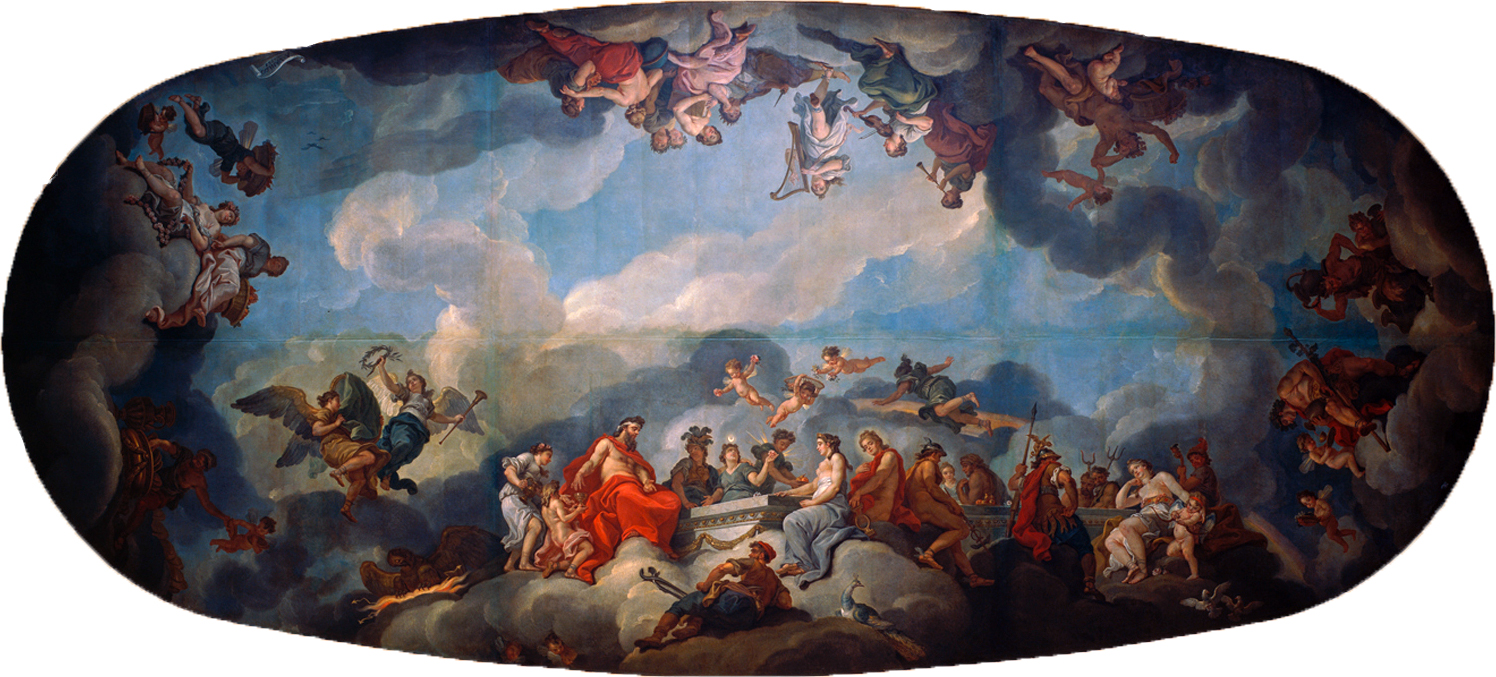
The Induction of Ganymede in Olympus (1768) by van Loo. Ganymede and Zeus are visible together at the left end of the gods' table, bottom.

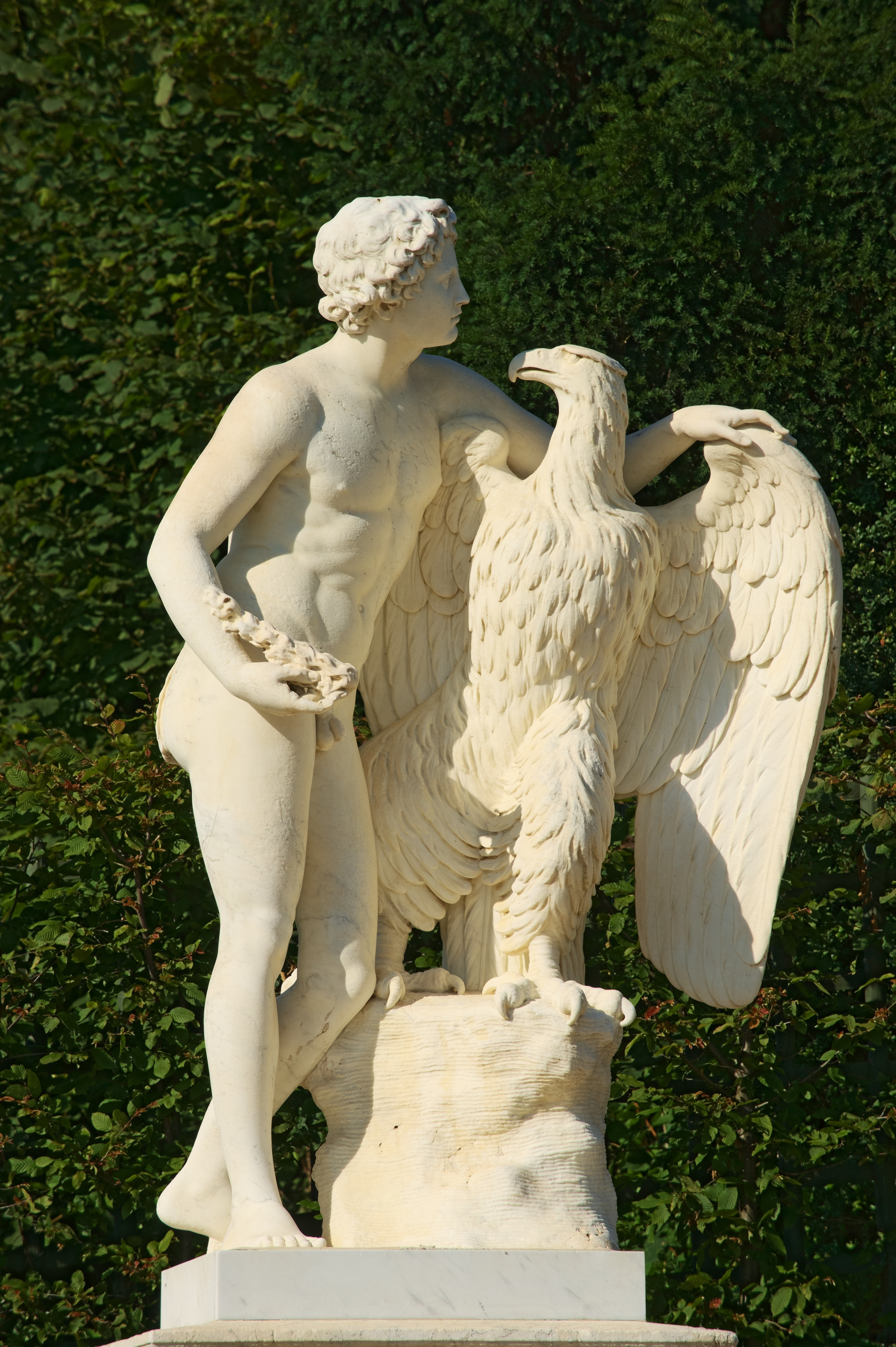
Ganymède Médicis (1684–1685) by Pierre Laviron at Versailles.

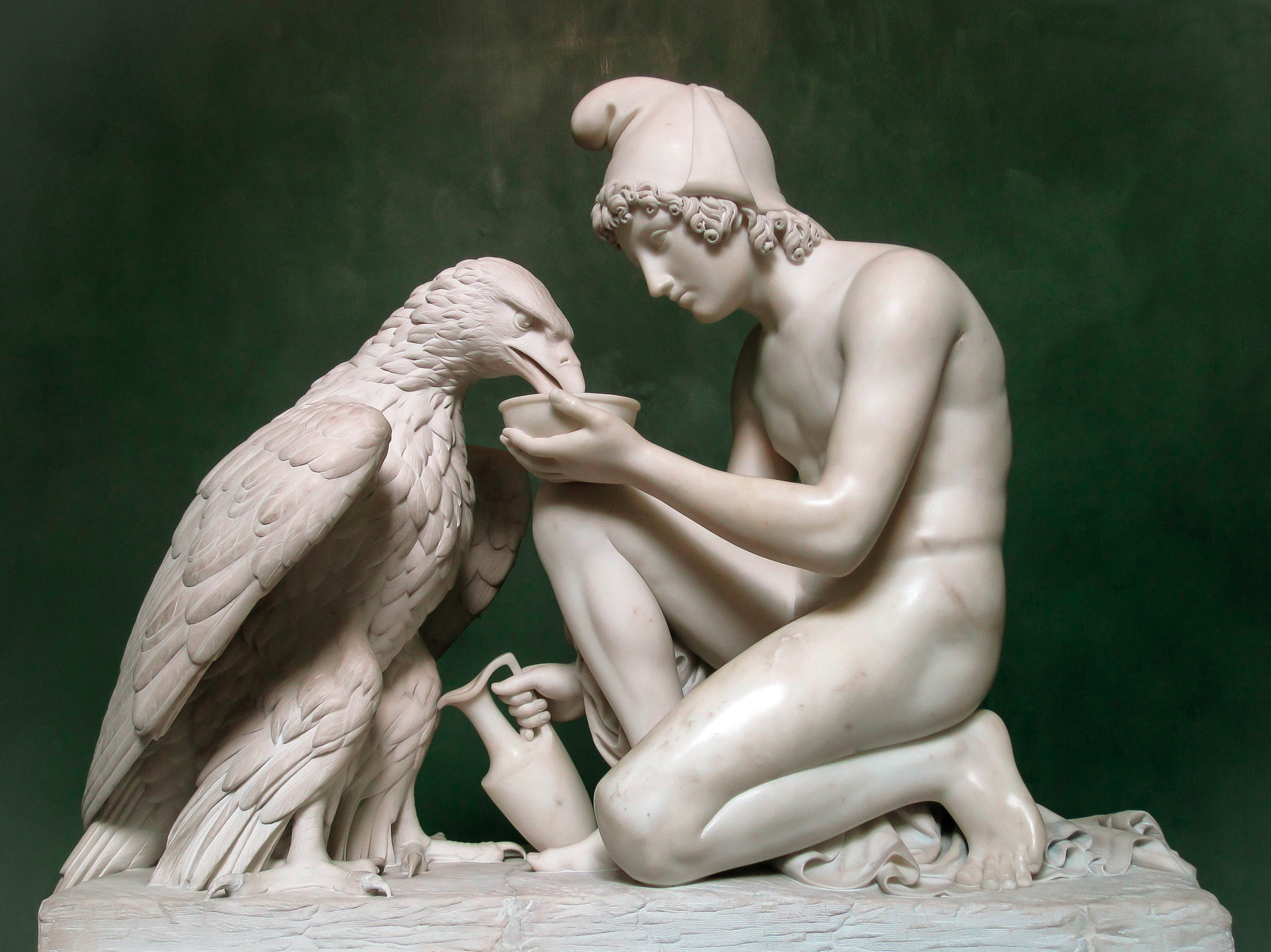
Ganymede Waters Zeus as an Eagle by Bertel Thorvaldsen (Thorvaldsens Museum, Copenhagen, Denmark)

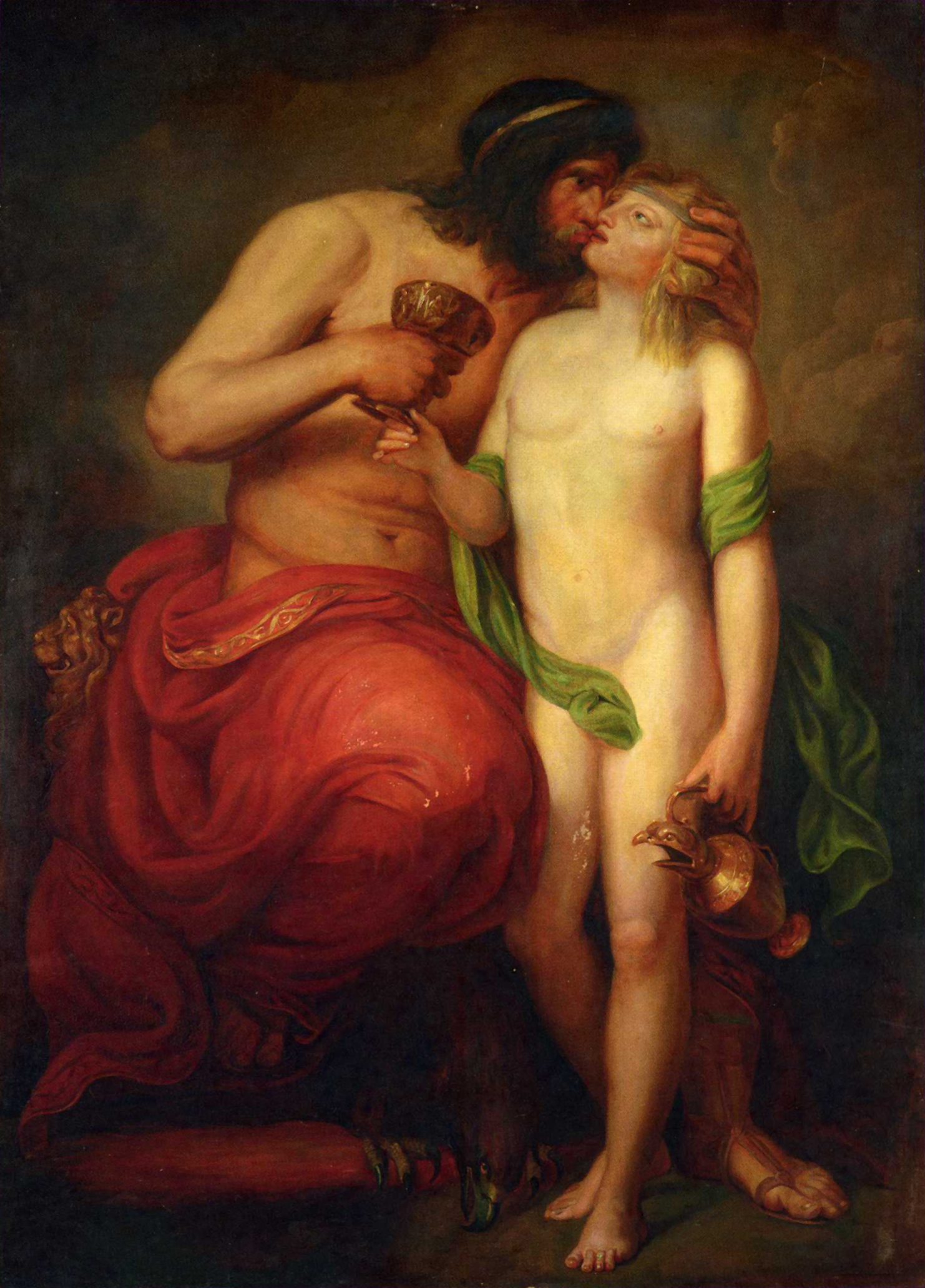
Zeus kissing Ganymede. 19th century copy after a c. 1780 original by Wilhelm Böttner.

=== Modern ===
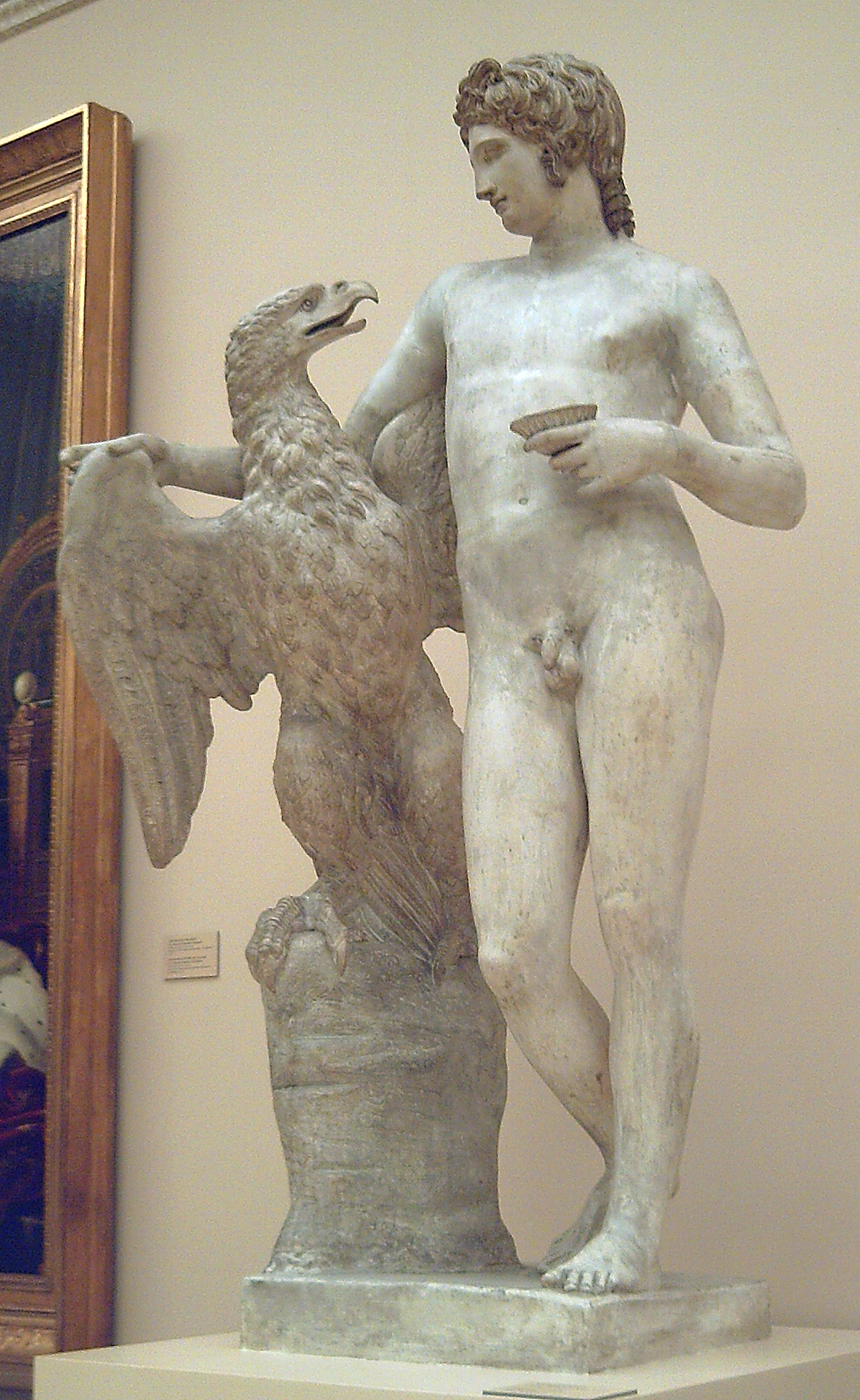
Ganymede (1804) by José Álvarez Cubero

- José Álvarez Cubero's sculpture of Ganymede, executed in Paris in 1804, brought the Spanish sculptor immediate recognition as one of the leading sculptors of his day.
- Vollmer's Wörterbuch der Mythologie aller Völker, (Stuttgart, 1874) illustrates "Ganymede" by an engraving of a "Roman relief", showing a seated bearded Zeus who holds the cup aside to draw a naked Ganymede into his embrace. That engraving however was nothing but a copy of Raphael Mengs's counterfeit Roman fresco, painted as a practical joke on the eighteenth-century art critic Johann Winckelmann who was growing desperate in his search for homoerotic Greek and Roman antiquities. This story is very briefly told by Goethe in his Italienische Reise.
- At Chatsworth in the nineteenth century the bachelor Duke of Devonshire added to his sculpture gallery Adamo Tadolini's Neoclassic "Ganymede and the Eagle", in which a luxuriously reclining Ganymede, embraced by one wing, prepares to exchange a peck with the eagle. The delicate cup in his hand is made of gilt-bronze, lending an unsettling immediacy and realism to the white marble group.
- In the early years of the twentieth century, the topos of Ganymede's abduction by Zeus was drafted into the service of commercial enterprise. Adapting an 1892 lithograph by Frank Kirchbach, the brewery of Anheuser-Busch launched in 1904 an ad campaign publicizing the successes of Budweiser beer. Collectibles featuring the graphics of the poster continued to be produced into the early 1990s.
- The poem "Ganymed" by Goethe was set to music by Franz Schubert in 1817; published in his Opus 19, no. 3 (D. 544). Also set by Hugo Wolf.
- The Portuguese sculptor António Fernandes de Sá represented the abduction of Ganymede in 1898. The sculpture can be found in Jardim da Cordoaria, in Porto (Portugal).
- American artist Henry Oliver Walker painted a mural in the Library of Congress in Washington D.C. c. 1900, depicting an adolescent, nude Ganymede on the back of an eagle.

== Family tree ==
Trojan race

Oceanus	Tethys
Atlas	Pleione	Scamander	Idaea	Simoeis
Zeus/Jupiter	Electra	Teucer
Dardanus	Batea
Ilus	Erichthonius	Astyoche
Callirrhoe	Tros
Ilus	Ganymede	Assaracus	Hieromneme
Laomedon	Themiste	Capys
Priam	Anchises	Aphrodite/Venus	Latinus
Creusa	Aeneas	Lavinia
Ascanius	Silvius
Aeneas Silvius
Latinus Silvius
Alba
Atys
Capys
Capetus
Tiberinus Silvius
Agrippa
Romulus Silvius
Aventinus
Procas
Numitor	Amulius
Ares/Mars	Rhea Silvia/Ilia
Hersilia	Romulus	Remus

== List of ancient sources ==
Ganymede is named by various ancient Greek and Roman authors:

- Homer – Iliad 5.265; Iliad 20.232;
- Homerica – The Little Iliad, Frag 7;
- Homeric Hymns – Hymn V, To Aphrodite, 203–217;
- Theognis – Fragments 1.1345;
- Pindar – Olympian Odes 1; 11;
- Euripides – Iphigenia at Aulis 1051;
- Plato – Phaedrus 255; Laws 636c
- Apollonios Rhodios – Argonautica 3.112f;
- ps-Apollodorus – Bibliotheke 2.104; 3.141;
- Strabo – Geography 13.1.11;
- Pausanias – Guide to Greece V.24.5; V.26.2–3;
- Diodorus Siculus – The Library of History 4.75.3;
- Hyginus
  - Fabulae 89; 224; 271;
  - Astronomica 2.16; 2.29;
- Ovid – Metamorphoses 10.152;
- Virgil – Aeneid 1.28; 5.252;
- Cicero – De Natura Deorum 1.40;
- Valerius Flaccus – Argonautica 2.414; 5.690;
- Statius
  - Thebaid 1.549;
  - Silvae 3.4.13;
- Apuleius – The Golden Ass 6.15; 6.24;
- Quintus Smyrnaeus – Fall of Troy 8.427; 14.324;
- Nonnus – Dionysiaca 8.93; 10.258; 10.308; 12.39; 14.430; 15.279; 17.76; 19.158; 25.430; 27.241; 31.252; 33.74; 39.67; 47.98;
- Suda – Ilion; Minos;
