= Statue of Ganymede =

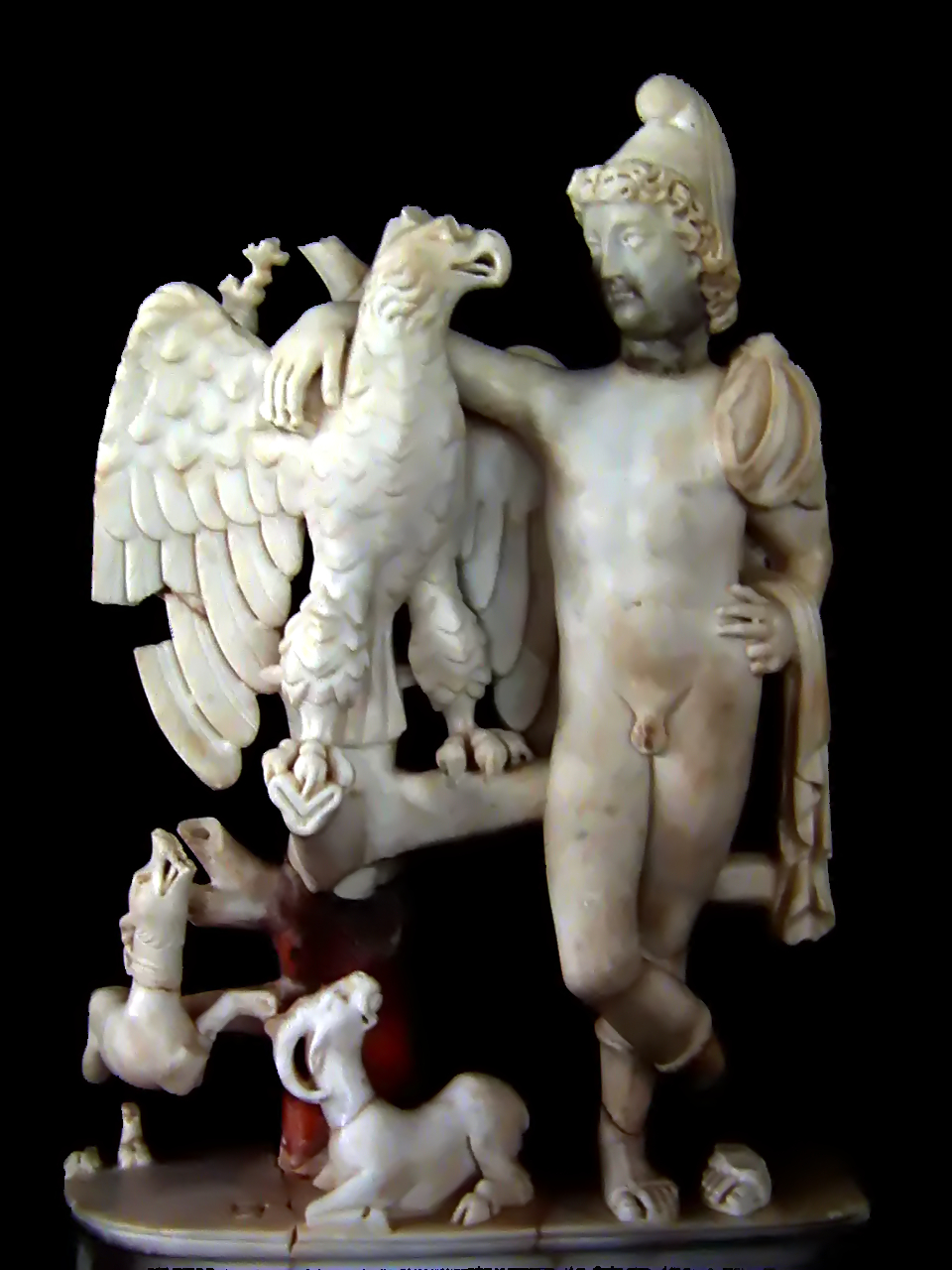
- The statue, seen in 2001

The Statue of Ganymede is a white marble statue, 49 cm tall, found at Carthage, dating from the Fifth Century.

It was stolen from the Carthage Paleo-Christian Museum on November 8, 2013. It was recovered in 2017.
