= Ganymede Abducted by the Eagle =

Painting by Antonio da Correggio

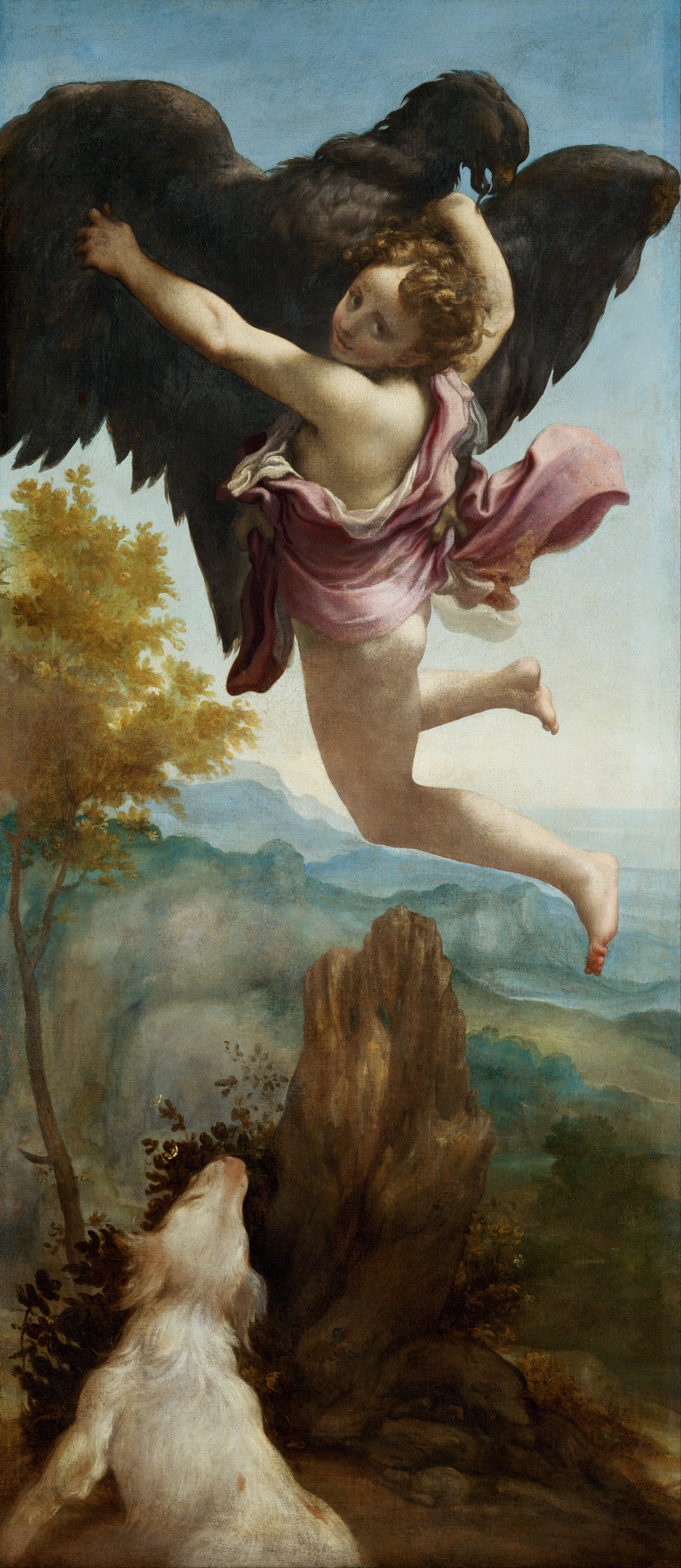
- Artist: Antonio da Correggio
- Year: c. 1531–1532
- Medium: Oil on canvas
- Dimensions: 163.5 cm × 70.5 cm (64.4 in × 27.8 in)
- Location: Kunsthistorisches Museum

Ganymede Abducted by the Eagle (c. 1531–1532) is a painting by the Italian late Renaissance artist Antonio da Correggio. It is housed in the Kunsthistorisches Museum, Vienna, Austria.

The work was part of a series executed by Correggio for Federico II Gonzaga in Mantua, about the loves of Jupiter. The painting depicts Ganymede.

== History ==
The series of Jupiter's Loves was conceived after the success of Venus and Cupid with a Satyr. Correggio painted four canvasses in total, although others had been programmed perhaps.

In the first edition of his Lives, late Renaissance art biographer Giorgio Vasari mentions only two of the paintings, Leda (today at the Gemäldegalerie, Berlin) and one Venus (presumably the Danae currently in the Borghese Gallery of Rome), although he knew them only from descriptions provided by Giulio Romano. Vasari mentions that the commissioner, Duke Federico II Gonzaga, wanted to donate the works to emperor and King of Spain Charles V: the fact that the other two works, the Ganymede and Jupiter and Io, were in Spain during the 16th century implies that they were part of the same series. British art historian Cecil Gould suggested that Federico had commissioned the Io and Ganymede for himself, and that they were ceded to Charles V only after the duke's death in 1540, perhaps on occasion of the marriage of the king's son, Philip; others hypothesized that Federico ordered them for the Ovid room in his Palazzo Te.

In 1603–1604 the painting was acquired by the emperor Rudolf II together with Parmigianino's Cupid Making His Arch, and sent to Prague. The canvas was in Vienna since as early as the 1610s, when it is talked in the Habsburg imperial collections together with Io.

== Sources ==
- Adani, Giuseppe (2007). Correggio pittore universale. Correggio: Silvana Editoriale. ISBN 978-88-366-0977-2.

== Other links ==
- Page at museum's website (in German)
