= Carthage Paleo-Christian Museum =

Coordinates: 36.8484°N 10.3247°E

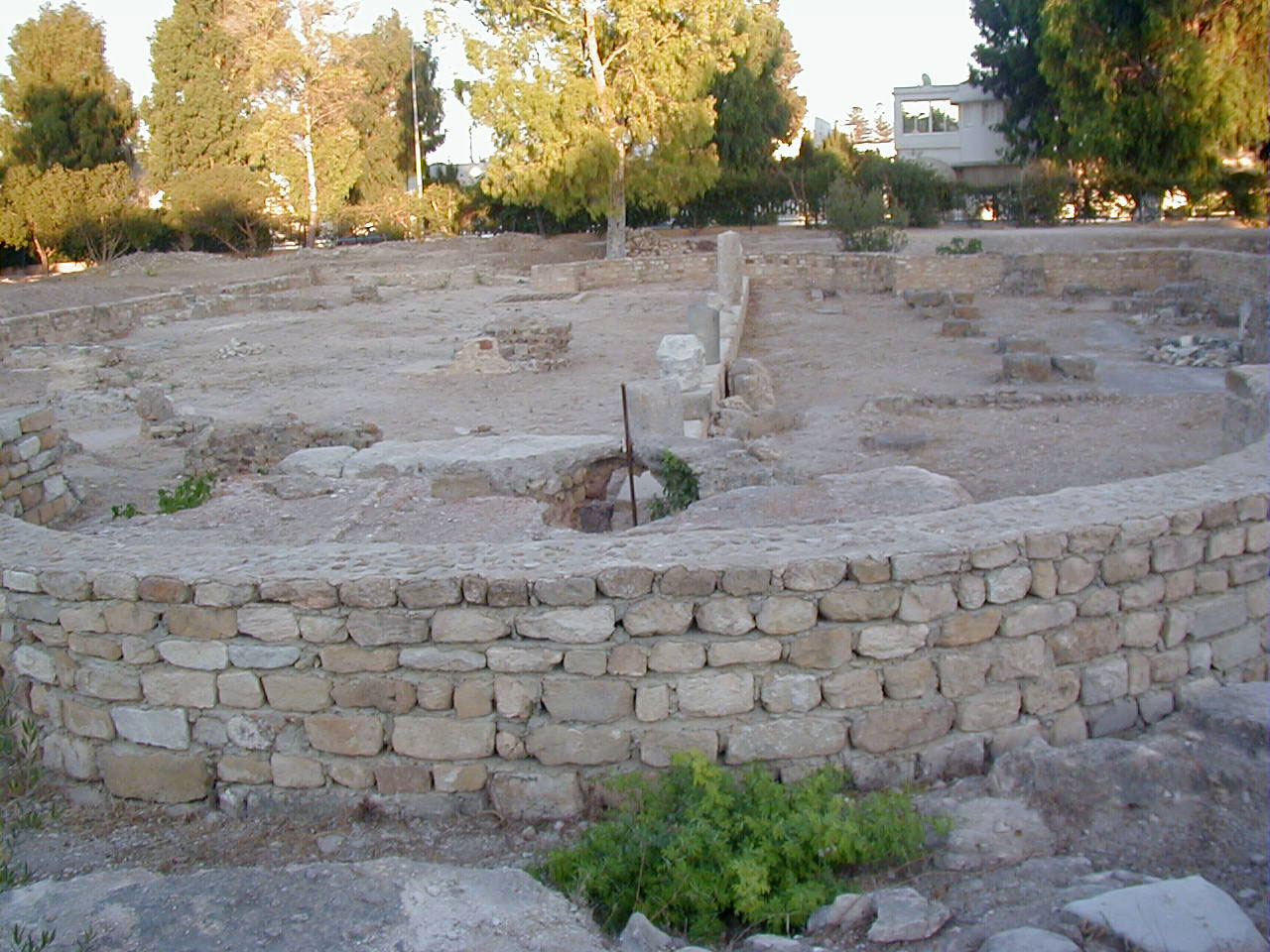
- Location: Carthage, Tunisia
- Type: archaeological museum
- Collection size: Paleochristian art

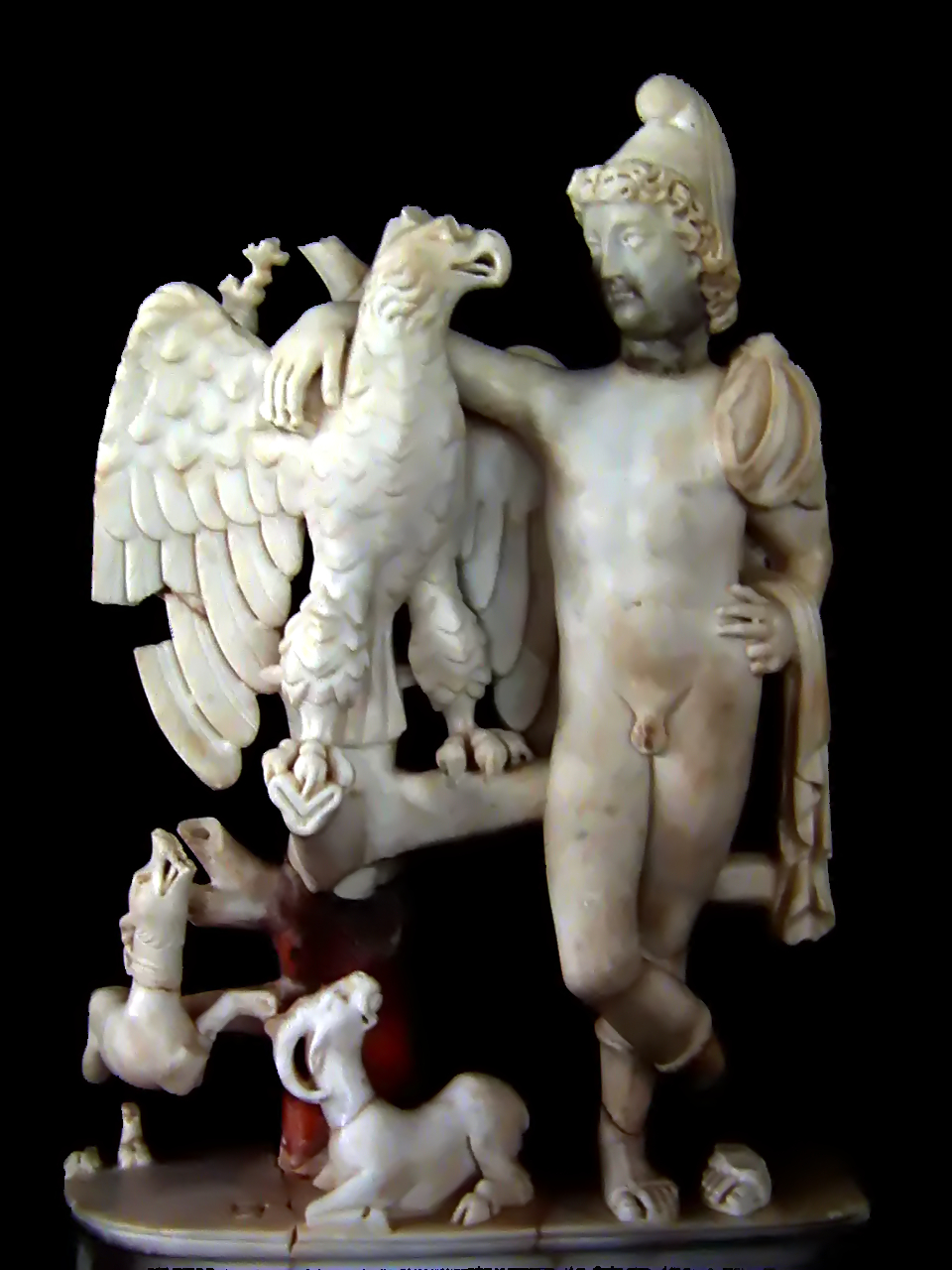
Statue of Ganymede

The Carthage Paleo-Christian Museum is an archaeological museum of Paleochristian artifacts, located in Carthage, Tunisia. Built on an excavation site, it lies above the former Carthaginian basilica.

== History ==
The Danish consul, Christian Tuxen Falbe, conducted the first examination of the archaeological site in 1830. Charles Ernest Beulé and Alfred Louis Delattre carried out excavations in the second half of the 19th century. Cardinal Charles Lavigerie established the Carthage National Museum in 1875. French archaeologists' excavations in the 1920s initially garnered a great deal of attention due to the proof they provided regarding child sacrifice. Whether child sacrifice was used in ancient Carthage has been the subject of intense debate among researchers.

It lists a number of historical structures that date back as early as 1885. The Carthage Paleo-Christian Museum is home to a sizable collection of mosaics that were discovered amid the city's ruins. The artifacts on show are from the Roman, Paleo-Christian, and African civilizations and date as far back as the first century BCE.

Exhibits from the open-air Carthage Paleo-Christian Museum were discovered between 1975 and 1984. UNESCO has designated the ruins' location as a World Heritage Site. The building was constructed on what was once a Carthaginian basilica.

== See also ==
- Culture of Tunisia
- List of museums in Tunisia
- Religion in Tunisia
