= The Rape of Ganymede (Rubens) =

Painting by Peter Paul Rubens

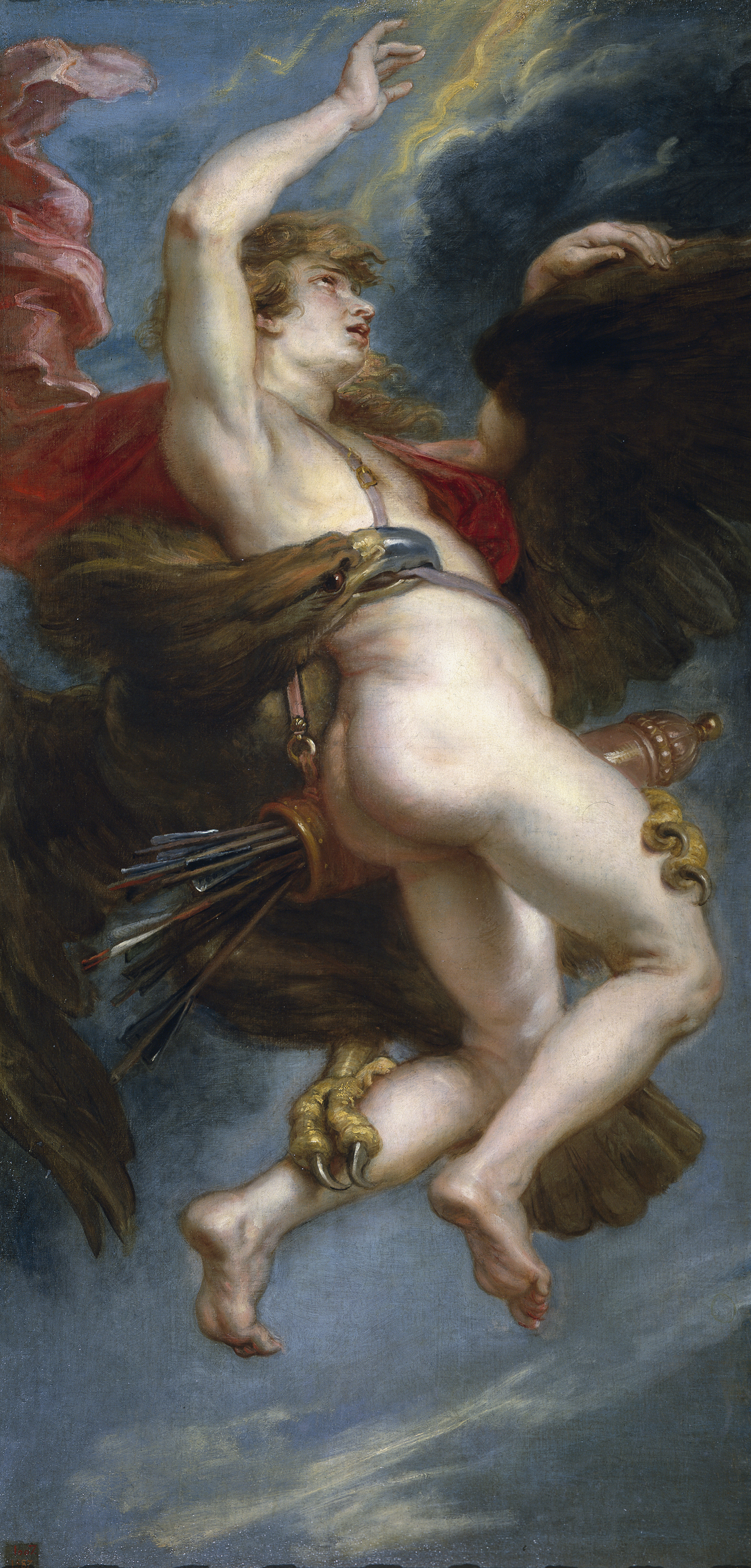
- Artist: Peter Paul Rubens
- Year: c. 1636-38
- Type: Oil on canvas
- Dimensions: 181 cm × 87.3 cm (71 in × 34.4 in)
- Location: Museo del Prado, Madrid, Spain

The Rape of Ganymede or The Abduction of Ganymede is a painting by the Flemish Baroque painter Peter Paul Rubens produced between 1636 and 1638 for the Spanish king Philip IV of Spain's hunting lodge. The painting is based on a story recounted in classical poet Ovid's Metamorphoses (X, 155-161). It depicts the moment when the Roman supreme god Jupiter, acting through the form of an eagle, captures the young shepherd Ganymede and lifts him into the air. It is in the collection of the Museo del Prado in Madrid. The dramatic scene gave Rubens ample opportunity to show his skill in depicting a lively scene around a beautiful male nude.

The context and name of the work is shared with an earlier Rubens c. 1611-1612, which instead portrays Ganymede's arrival on Olympus with the previous cup-bearer, Hebe, handing him her vessel as a banquet begins in the background.

== Narrative ==
The painting depicts the abduction of the beautiful Trojan youth, Ganymede, by Jupiter who appears in the form an eagle. The homoerotic story which goes back to Classical stories first recounted by Homer and Virgil recounts how the supreme God Jupiter falls madly in love with a beautiful young man. The account most familiar to artists in Rubens' time was that as told by Ovid in his Metamorphoses: “The king of the gods Jupiter once burned with love for the Phrygian Ganymede, and something was found which Jove would rather be than what he was. Still he did not deign to take the form of any bird save that which could bear his thunderbolts [the eagle]. Without delay he cleft the air on his lying wings and stole away the Trojan boy, who even now, though against the will of Juno, mingles the nectar and attends the cups of Jove.” This contrasts against Virgil's version where Jupiter sends a regular eagle without taking on the form of a bird himself, which may have influenced the work as well.

== Commission ==
Rubens received in 1636 a commission from the Spanish king Philip IV of Spain to create a series of 60 mythological paintings to decorate the Torre de la Parada, a hunting lodge of the king outside Madrid. The mythological scenes depicted in the series were largely based on the Metamorphoses of Ovid. Rubens realized this important commission with the assistance of a large number of Antwerp painters such as Jacob Jordaens, Cornelis de Vos, Jan Cossiers, Peter Snayers, Thomas Willeboirts Bosschaert, Theodoor van Thulden, Jan Boeckhorst, Jacob Peter Gowy, Jan Baptist Borrekens and others, who worked after Rubens' designs. Rubens executed a number of the final paintings himself. This is the case of The Rape of Ganymede.

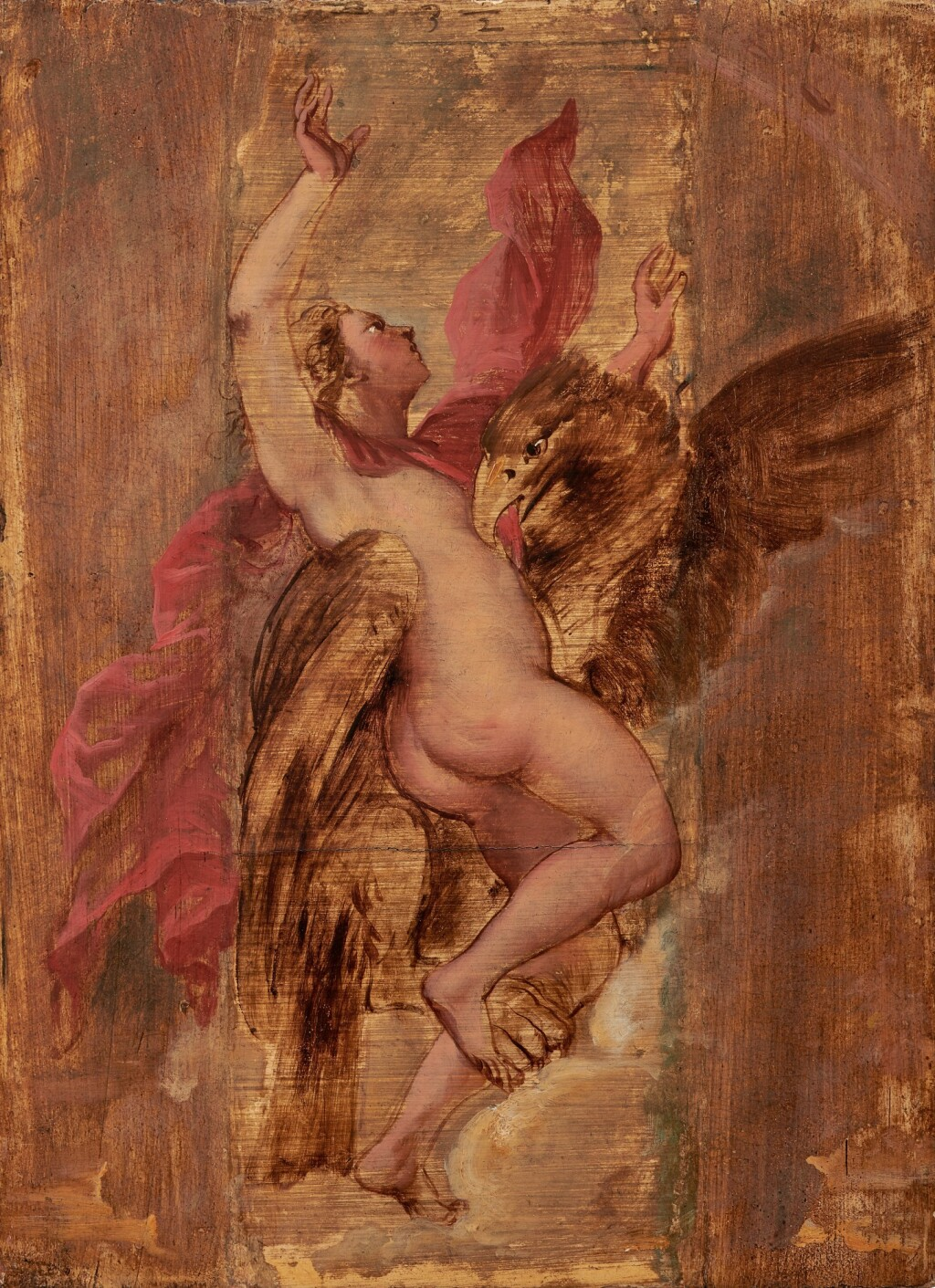
The Abduction of Ganymede, preparatory sketch c. 1636 to early 1637, Princeton

The preparatory designs for the series of paintings are in the collections of various museums including housed in the Museo del Prado in Madrid, the Museum Boijmans van Beuningen in Rotterdam, the Royal Museums of Fine Arts of Belgium in Brussels and the Princeton University Art Museum. A sketch for The Rape of Ganymede is held at the Princeton University Art Museum. There may be another preparatory sketch for the painting which was in the collection of the painter and draughtsman Richard Cosway (1742–1821), an admirer of Rubens.

== Description ==
Rubens depicts the moment when the eagle catches the young man and lifts him violently into the air. The thunderbolt in the background adds to the dramatic effect and alludes to the force and fury with which the kidnapping takes place. The diagonal composition emphasizes the upward movement of the figures. Rubens based the figures on classical sculpture which he had sketched during his stay in Rome decades earlier. The figure of Ganymede is based on one of the children of the Hellenistic group of the Laocoön in the Vatican Museum. The figure of the eagle is based on some of his own compositions such as the Prometheus Bound.

The tall vertical format of the finished painting in the Prado suggests that it was intended to be placed between windows in the king's hunting lodge. The preparatory sketch in the Princeton University Art Museum and the final version in the Prado show various differences including in Ganymede's expression and physique, the addition of a quiver with arrows and the position of the eagle, whose beak catches the strap of the quiver rather than the small piece of red cloth in the sketch. Rubens also added Jupiter's thunderbolt in the sky. In the final version Ganymede’s left hand rests on the eagle’s outstretched wing, which may have been inspired by Michelangelo's treatment of this subject. In the finished work Ganymede appears more apprehensive. This is possibly because Rubens regarded the eagle not as Jupiter himself but as his emissary, as in Virgil’s account. In the final work Ganymede looks upward to the bolt of lightning which personifies Jupiter above. The quiver added to the final version is placed and depicted in a manner which is very suggestive of an erect male member and clearly points to the erotic connotations of the story.
