= Ganymede (band) =

- Origin: United States
- Genre: Electropop
- Years active: 2000–present
- Label: Cohaagen Music
- Members: David Friede; Patrick Runkle

Ganymede is an American electropop band that has released four albums since May 2000. These include After the Fall, Euromantique, Space and Time, and Operation Ganymede, the latter of which was released in August 2008. The act's most-recognized songs, "Neon Rain" and "Hong Kong," earned club play in the electropop/goth/electroclash scene.

Band members Patrick Runkle and David Friede (formerly of the band Fr/action) have also produced a series of covers for Cleopatra Records and others, appearing alongside Dead or Alive and Sigue Sigue Sputnik. Ganymede was the first band to be released on the major independent electropop label Ninthwave Records, and now releases on Cohaagen Music. The band plays vintage analog keyboards and drum machines to create a "classic" electro sound.
