= Jupiter Indiges =

Hero from Roman mythology

According to the Roman historian Livy, Jupiter Indiges is the name given to the deified hero Aeneas. In some versions of his story, after his death he is raised up to become a god by Numicus, a local deity of the river of the same name, at the request of Aeneas' mother Venus. The title Pater Indiges or simply Indiges is also used.

The Greek historian Dionysius of Halicarnassus notes that when the body of Aeneas was not found after a battle between his group of Trojan exiles in Italy and the native Rutulians, it was assumed that he had been taken up by the gods to become a deity. He also presents the alternative explanation that Aeneas may have simply drowned in the river Numicus and that a shrine in his memory was built there.

The term "Indiges", thought by some to be from the same root as "indigenous", may reflect the fact that these minor deities (collectively, the Di indigetes) originated locally in Italy. An alternate explanation is that they were individuals who were raised to the status of gods after mortal life. Compare for example Sol Indiges.

== In Metamorphoses ==
Ovid depicts Aeneas's deification in Book 14 of Metamorphoses:

The merit of Aeneas now had moved the Gods. Even Juno stayed her lasting hate, when, with the state of young Iulus safe, the hero son of Cytherea was prepared for Heaven. In a council of the Gods, Venus arose, embraced her father's neck, and said: «My father, ever kind to me, I do beseech your kind indulgence now; grant, dearest, to Aeneas, my own son and also your own grandson, grant to him a godhead power, although of lowest class, sufficient if but granted. It is enough to have looked once upon the unlovely realm. And once to have gone across the Stygian streams.»

The Gods assented, and the Queen of Jove nodded consent with calm, approving face. The father said, «You well deserve the gift, both you who ask it, and the one for whom you ask it: what you most desire is yours, my daughter.» He decreed, and she rejoiced and thanked her parent. Borne by harnessed doves over and through the light air, she arrived safe on Laurentine shores: Numicius there winds through his tall reeds to the neighboring sea the waters of his stream: and there she willed Numicius should wash perfectly away from her Aeneas every part that might be subject unto death; and bear it far with quiet current into Neptune's realm.

The horned Numicius satisfied the will of Venus; and with flowing waters washed from her Aeneas every mortal part, and sprinkled him, so that the essential part of immortality remained alone, and she anointed him, thus purified, with heavenly essence, and she touched his face with sweetest nectar and ambrosia mixt, thereby transforming him into a God. The throng of the Quirini later named the new God Indiges, and honored him.

— Ovid (trans. Brookes More, 1922), Metamorphoses, Book 14, Line 581
