= Di indigetes =

Roman deities

In classical Latin, the epithet Indiges, singular in form, is applied to Sol (Sol Indiges) and to Jupiter of Lavinium, later identified with Aeneas. One theory holds that it means the "speaker within", and stems from before the recognition of divine persons. Another, which the Oxford Classical Dictionary holds more likely, is that it means "invoked" in the sense of "pointing at", as in the related word indigitamenta.

In Augustan literature, the di indigites are often associated with di patrii and appear in lists of local divinities (that is, divinities particular to a place). Servius noted that Praeneste had its own indigetes.

Evidence pertaining to di indigites is rarely found outside Rome and Lavinium, but a fragmentary inscription from Aletrium (modern Alatri, north of Frosinone) records offerings to di Indicites including Fucinus, a local lake-god; Summanus, a god of nocturnal lightning; Fiscellus, otherwise unknown, but perhaps a local mountain god; and the Tempestates, weather deities. This inscription has been interpreted as a list of local or nature deities to whom transhumant shepherds should make propitiary offers.

== Wissowa's indigetes ==
In Georg Wissowa's terminology, the di indigetes or indigites were Roman deities that were not adopted from other religions, as distinguished from the di novensides. Wissowa thus regarded the indigetes as "indigenous gods", and the novensides as "newcomer gods". Ancient use, however, does not treat the two terms as a dichotomy, nor maintain a clear-cut distinction between indigetes and novensides. Wissowa's interpretation is no longer widely accepted and the meaning remains uncertain.

Wissowa listed 33 di indigetes, including two collectives in the plural, the Lares of the estate and the Lemures of the dead. Any list of indigetes, however, is conjectural; Raimo Anttila points out that "we do not know the list of the di indigetes."

== Ancient sources ==
Carl Koch compiled a list of Latin authors and inscriptions using the phrase di indigetes or Indiges:

- Livy, 1.2.6, on the end of the mortal life of Aeneas on the river Numicus and his identification with or assimilation to Iovem Indigetem in that place.
- Livy, 8.9.6, the formula of the devotio of Decius Mus
- CIL I Elog. I from Pompeii: ... apellatusque est Indige(n)s Pater et in deorum numero relatus.
- Vergil, Aeneid 12.794, as an epithet of Aeneas
- Pliny, Natural History 3.56, as an epithet of Sol
- CIL 10.5779 from Sora, Iovi Airsii Dis Indigetibus cum aedicl(a) et base [et ae]di? et porticu.
- Vergil, Georgics 1.498, Dii patrii Indigetes et Romule Vestaque Mater... .
- Ovid, Metamporphoses 15.862, ... di Indigetes genitorque Quirine ..., in the invocation that concludes the poem.
- Silius Italicus, Punica 9.278, Di Indigetes Faunusque satorque Quirinus; also 10.435 ff.
- Lucan, Pharsalia 1.556, mentions the di indigetes along with the Lares.
- Claudian, Bellum Gildonicum 1.131
- Macrobius, Ad Somnium Scipionis 1.9
- Symmachus, Relatio 3.10

== Scholarship on the di indigetes ==
C. Koch, A. Grenier, H. J. Rose, Hendrik Wagenvoort, E. Vetter, K. Latte, G. Radke, R. Schilling, and more recently, R. Anttila have made contributions to the enquiry into the meaning of the word Indiges and on the original nature of the di indigetes.

=== Koch ===
Carl Koch's analysis is particularly complete, and centers mainly on the question of Sol Indiges: Koch has argued that Sol Indiges is the god to which the Agonium of December 11 is devoted. (Note: This argument relies on the fragment of the fasti discovered at Ostia in 1921, which reads [... ag]ON IND[igeti ...] and on Johannes Lydus de Mensibus IV 155: ... Agonalia daphneephorooi kai genarcheeei Heliooi ...: Agonalia for the laurel bearer and primaeval ancestor Sol, that Lydus compares to a similar custom in Athens terminating with laurel bearing. Sol Indiges had two festivals, the other one occurring on August 9, on the Quirinal.) Koch remarks too that the festival of December 11 is in correspondence with the Matralia of June 11, dedicated to Mater Matuta, considered the goddess of dawn and, in the ritual, the aunt of the sun, who is the son of the night. Koch was the first to advance the hypothesis of the Sol Indiges as the forefather (Stammvater) of the Roman nation. (Note: Rose (1937) rejected Koch's interpretation of the di Indigetes as the primordial ancestors (Stammvatern) of the Roman nation on the grounds that the formula of Diodorus is not a Roman original, but is framed along the Greek fashion and looks to reflect a Greek original.)

=== Grenier ===
Albert Grenier contributed a paper in which he expands on the results obtained by Koch and pays more attention to the original nature of the di Indigetes. He acknowledges similar conclusions have been reached by Hendrik Wagenvoort.

As Koch did, Grenier cites the formula of the oath of loyalty to M. Livius Drusus in 91 BCE by a Latin chief, preserved by Diodorus Siculus, in which are mentioned, after Iuppiter Capitolinus, Vesta, and Mars Pater, Helios genarchees, and euergetin zooin te kai phytoon Geen (‘the mother Earth which benefits animals and plants’). Grenier thinks that Sol Indiges and the Good Mother Earth (whom he interprets to be the Mater Matuta of the Matralia) (Note: Grenier cites Vendryes (1939) to support this interpretation against that of Mater matuta as the goddess of dawn. The root of Matuta which has given matutinus, morning time, would originally mean maturus, ripe as favourable time or right time for birth, thence for extension would come its meaning of morning as the most favourable time of the day.) would be the di Indigetes of the devotio of Decius Mus.

He goes on to analyse the other testimonies related to the cult of the di indigetes found in Dionysius of Halicarnassus.

The first is the inscription on the monument on the Numicus, which was thought to be dedicated to Aeneas Iuppiter Indiges, which reads: "Of the Father God chthonios who rules the flow of the Numicius." Grenier remarks that the inscription does not mention Aeneas, and is in fact just a small sanctuary of the god of the river. In this same region, Pliny (see prev. section) mentions a Sol Indiges, and Dionysius describes a monument called the Sanctuary of the Sun in his time, made up by two altars on an East–West line by a marsh: It was believed to have been erected by Aeneas as a token of thanksgiving for the miracle of the spring. On this evidence, Grenier concludes that Sol Indiges is connected to Lavinium and to the cult of the Penates publici of Rome. This fact is supported by Varro: Lavinium ibi dii penates nostri. This identification is further supported by the tradition that the new consuls, upon entering office, sacrificed on this sanctuary of the Sun to Iuppiter Indiges and by the fact that the formulae of the oaths never mention the di indigetes along with Iuppiter. (Note: For example, the Table of Bantia reads: "Iuranto per Iovem deosque Penates".)

Grenier concludes from such evidence that the Penates were included within the indigetes. (Note: The fact that in imperial times the formulae of the oaths substituted the name of the princeps for the mention of the Penates points to the origin of the cult of the genius of the emperor in that of Penates publici.) The Roman Penates publici were represented as two young men or boys, similar to the Dioscures, and identified as gods brought by Aeneas from Troy, as the true identity of the Indigetes was secret to avoid exauguration. (Note: ... Romani celatum esse voluerunt in cuius dei tutela urbs Roma sit et iure pontificum cautum est ne suis nominibus dii romani appellarentur ne exaugurari possint.)

Grenier considers the identification with Aeneas and Romulus a later development, and thinks the original indigetes were naturalistic gods: forces like the sun, the earth, and the waters, which make the wheat and the children grow. Finally, he concludes that they should have been the turba deorum of the indigitamenta, which expressed the animistic nature of the most ancient Roman religion. (Note: A relevant point in the discussion of the sources that Grenier has overlooked is the fact that the inscription quoted in Greek by Dionysius, Patros Theoy Chthonioy ..., must be translated into the Latin Dei Patrii Indigetis. For a correspondence, see the Greek interpretation of Tages as Hermes Chthonios.)

=== Latte ===
Kurt Latte has supported Carl Koch's thesis that the most ancient Roman religious concepts were based on the natural forces of the sun, moon and waters. He cites and quotes the invocations to the goddess of the Moon at the beginning of every month by the pontifex minor, who repeated for five or seven times the invocation: "Dies te quinque calo Iuno Covella" or when the Nonae were on the seventh day: "Septem dies te calo Iuno Covella". The invocation to the god of the Tiber during the summer drought: "Adesto Tiberine, cum tuis undis". Latte supposes that these invocations were justified by a faith in the magic power of words. Pater Indiges is attested by Solinus (II 15) as referred to Aeneas after his disappearance on the Numicius; Dionysius also makes reference to the Numicius. Latte thinks that it must be the same cult and the question is whether in Augustan times, the original Pater Indiges was transformed into Iuppiter Indiges. Whereas Dionysius's text may imply the latter interpretation to be the right one, Latte thinks the material is insufficient to decide.

The other occurrence of indiges in the singular is that of Sol Indiges, of which two festivals are known as well as the location of his cult on the Quirinal (from the Fasti) one of which is the "[ag]ON IND[igeti]". Latte argues that the date of this latter festival does not correspond with the yearly course of the sun, but could perhaps be the day on which sowing should be completed, citing Columella, thus the sacrifice should refer to the power of the sun on vegetation.

Latte concludes that, by putting all the above elements together, it could be argued that indiges might be traced to a representation in which man requests the god to ensure the safety of his sowing. As Numicus has its parallel with Tiber, so Sol has its own parallel in the goddess of the Moon. The naive faith in the influence of celestial bodies has countless parallels, even in Athens.

Latte goes on to say that besides these two, there are only instances in the plural which were already not understood by Varro's times. The poets of the Augustan era were without any clear idea of its original meaning, having only a vague idea that indiges was an archaism that had a strong ancient Roman flavor when calling on the gods.

Latte refutes Wissowa's assertion that it was a central concept in Roman theology, also on the grounds of its irrelevance in the Roman calendar, which reflects the most ancient known historical religious document. The inscription from Sora, dating to 4 BCE, could be the issue of Augustan restoration and not proof of an original Iuppiter indiges. Another inscription from Ardea mentions novem deivo and the context clearly does not allow the interpretation of newly imported, disproving Wissowa's assumption.

Latte has also inquired into the etymology of the word indiges. He recalls the attempt by Krestchmer to explain it with digitus (finger) which is problematic. In Rome, one did not use fingers when invoking the gods, and in the common original exit of the ancient singular. The most ancient connection with ag-ye, aio by Corssen is based on indigitare (frequentative as agitare for agere). However, more recent discussions have called this interpretation into question, as such formations are usually found only for monosyllabic verbal themes showing a vocalic shift with a preverbal, such as comes, superstes, trames, which aio excludes; moreover they have an active meaning in Latin. In addition, the hypothesis of a retrograde formation from indigitare has both linguistic and semantic difficulties: the construction with agere, meaning "rendering oneself present," implies an impossible formation from a consonantic shift and the semantics of this translation is highly unlikely for ancient times.

Another relevant remark by Latte concerns the belief in the efficacy of the divine appellates, which are sometimes the same for different gods like Heries Iunonis and Heres Martea. The Iguvine Tablets mention a ahtu iuvio and a ahtu marti, interpreted as Actui Iovio and Actui Martio, to which sacrifices are offered. Latte remarks that here, the offer is made to the abstract concept of the virtue or power of the god, and not to the god himself. Other gods had special entities representing their power as in Rome, including Salacia Neptuni and Lua Saturni.

Latte finally refuses the interpretation indigetes divi for Greek daimones found in the translation by Macrobius of Hesiod Opera 121, considering it influenced by late time speculations. The connection of the Gentilician cult of the sun of the Aurelii with that of Sol Indiges is impossible to prove.

=== Anttila ===
Most recently, glottologist Raimo Anttila has made renewed attempts into the inquiry of the original meaning of the word indiges in his book on the Proto-Indo-European root *ag.

Anttila thinks that all the etymological and formal impasses mentioned by Latte could be overcome, if one interprets the basis of the word indiges to be the verb ago in the sense to impel, to drive, to drive from within (*endo agentes), instead of the verb aio (I say). The action of the gods would be that of driving man just as man drives cattle e.g. also in sacrifice (agonium, etymology already cited by Ovid in his Fasti I 319 ff).

Anttila bases his analysis on the results of Latte, Radke, Schilling, and Ancillotti and Cerri. He agrees with Schilling's view that the concept underwent changes and its original meaning should be kept different from its later history. Anttila starts considering the coincidence of Indiges with an Agonium on December 11 and its concurrence with the festival of Mater Matuta on June 11. He thinks there is sufficient evidence to say that it has to do with a solar cult centered on Lavinium, connecting the sun with water and earth. Sol Indiges is Pater Indiges, divus pater, i.e. Iuppiter Indiges, the highest divine power, the one which makes nature produce food. This impelling action seems close to Aja Ekapad and Savitr as variant terms for the sun in connection with other natural phenomena. (Note: Dumezil had already cited Savitr as a parallel to Ceres.)

A similar tint is in Indra as Samaja gathering booty, the warrior aspect of economy. It is noteworthy that AGON IND repeat the same root *ag. The Italic evidence for sacrificial and divine power under *ag is plentiful. Umbrian divinities of action, ahtu, dative singular (from *ag-t-eu) are part of the sacrificial actions of Iuppiter and Mars, whereas with Cerfe, the growth action (genitive singular of *ker-s-o-) is assigned to the other gods, e.g. Cerfus Martius 'the principle of vegetative growth in the sphere of Mars' the equivalent of Ares Aphneios in Arcadia. The god of creation Brahman is called ajana, i.e. driver, instigator. It is a general human religious concept that men drive animals and god drives men. Since Indiges as driver-in makes sense, from this would also stem the meaning of indigitare, indigitamenta. Carrying out a ritual action results in driving, here agere and agonalis.

On the basis of this big picture, Anttila attempts to draw a more precise conclusion and overcome the remaining formal difficulties. He argues that holding to the old interpretation of indiges as 'the caller (forth)' and interpreting the uncertain Umbrian consonant-stem dative plural acetus 'to the callers forth' as Ancillotti and Cerri do is doubtful and the etymology would be better represented by an *ag- drive than by an *ag-ye say, as the supposed root *kei/*ki is a moving root too and not a calling root. (Note: On this point compare Dumezil's analysis of the etymology of goddess Ceres and of Cerus Manus, the good creator (found in Paul's Festi epitome p. 249, L 2nd), perhaps an indigitation of Ianus.) Radke has also proposed the possibility of *en-dhigh-et- grade 0 as in figulus (from IE stem DHEIG) as a nomen agentis meaning 'forming, shaping, generating from within', close to impelling.

To support his analysis, Anttila cites a medical term indigo/indigere meaning to drive bodily fluids, which is not attested in ancient texts. A hard tumor (scirosis) 'fit ex glutinoso et spisso humore quod confluendo ita membris indigitur ut insitus locis ubi considerit unum esse videatur': the tumor is formed by humours that run together to a certain location by pushing the limbs from the inside so that it looks like one thing with the limb where they set. So tumors are pushed in as tubers and plants. Although the lexicographic evidence is flimsy, Anttila thinks it is important, owing to the close relation between medicine and religion. Indiges, indigere would hint to something coming out and bringing forth an end result (pushing into a state). To drive in results in something coming out. The richness of nature deities or their epithets (ahtu) brings about the beneficial result of life / food. The coordinator would be Iuppiter Indiges, the Impeller corresponding to Zeus Ageetoor at Sparta.

Finally, Anttila considers the worst formal difficulty left, that of the suffix -et- and its vowel not rising in indigetes, as remarked by Radke. Similar formations are merges/mergitis (sheaf), ales/alitis (winged), mansues/mansuetis (tame), seges/segetis (cornfield, harvest, produce), two of which pertain to the growing and reaping domain; Anttila thinks that in archaic religious language, peculiar forms are often preserved. Indigitare evoking gods would be to drive them in for our needs and Sol Indiges would be the force that drives all of nature, particularly food. Radke, and Ancillotti and Cerri, interpret the -t- form as a kind of active participle or agent noun and this would be the only possibility. Latte too gives as a background for indiges the general appeal to natural forces in Roman religion, e.g. the summoning of the Moon goddess and other instances.

== Archeological finds ==
In 1958, an inscription was uncovered in Lavinium dating to the 3rd century BCE, reading Lare Aineia. In 1971, a temple built over a princely cenotaph in the Oriental style of the 7th century BCE was also discovered, probably on the site of a heroon described by Dionysius Halicarnassus. (Note: This indicates the Latin saga of Aeneas must have spread and developed between the 6th and 5th centuries probably around the sanctuaries of Lavinium and concomitant with the first Greek versions of the coming of Aeneas to Italy, Hellanicus in Dionysius.) This would support an ancient assimilation of Aeneas to Indiges Pater.

== See also ==
- Novensiles
- Dii Consentes
