= Numicus =

River in Roman mythology

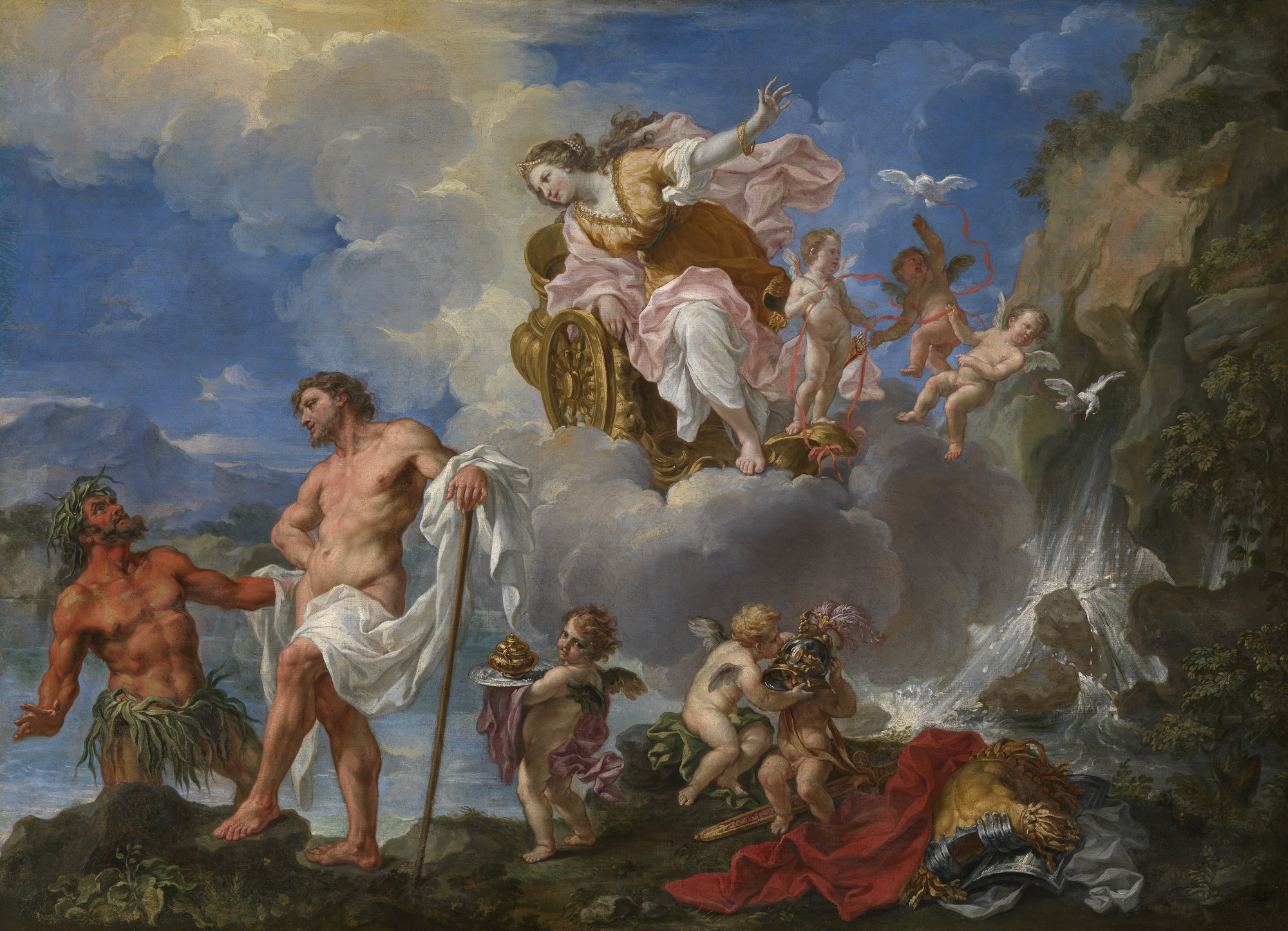
Pier Leone Ghezzi, The Purification of Aeneas in the River Numicius (ca. 1725)

The Numicus was a river of ancient Latium which flowed into the sea between the towns of Lavinium and Ardea. According to the mythology of Livy, Aeneas lies buried on its banks (from the original: 'Situs est, quemcumque eum dici ius fasque est super Numicum flumen'). The river is also represented in ancient texts as a river-god Numicius (Greek: Νουμικίος, Numikíos). As described by Ovid, at the behest of Venus, Numicus cleans Aeneas of all of his mortal parts so that he might become a god, known as Indiges.
