= Aeneas =

Trojan hero in Greco-Roman mythology

- Founder of Alba Longa
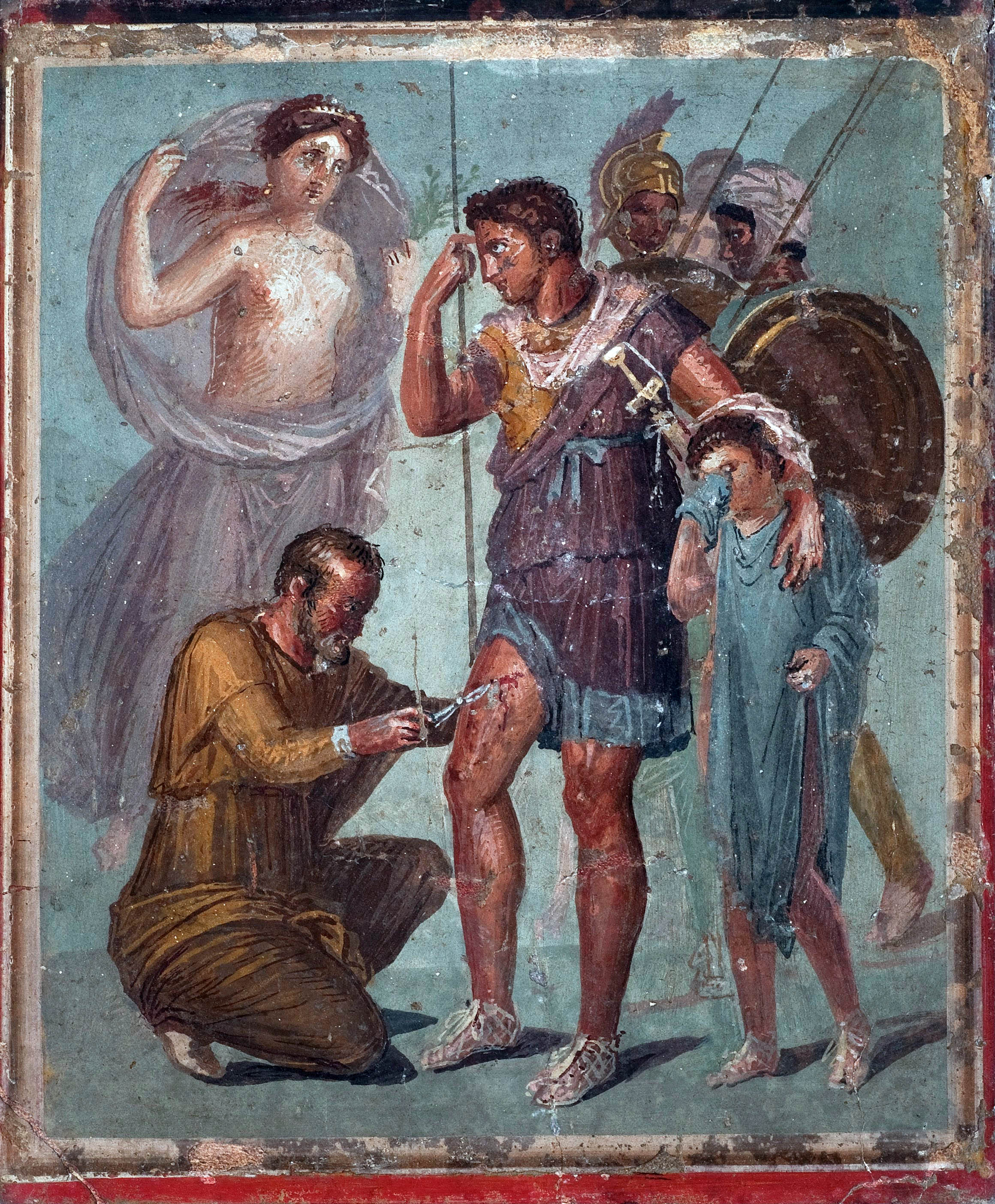
- Iapyx removing an arrowhead from the leg of Aeneas, with Aeneas's son, Ascanius, crying beside him. Antique fresco from Pompeii.
- Abode: Alba Longa

Genealogy
- Parents: Anchises and Aphrodite
- Siblings: Lyrus
- Consort: Creusa; Dido; Lavinia
- Offspring: Ascanius (by Creusa); Silvius (by Lavinia)

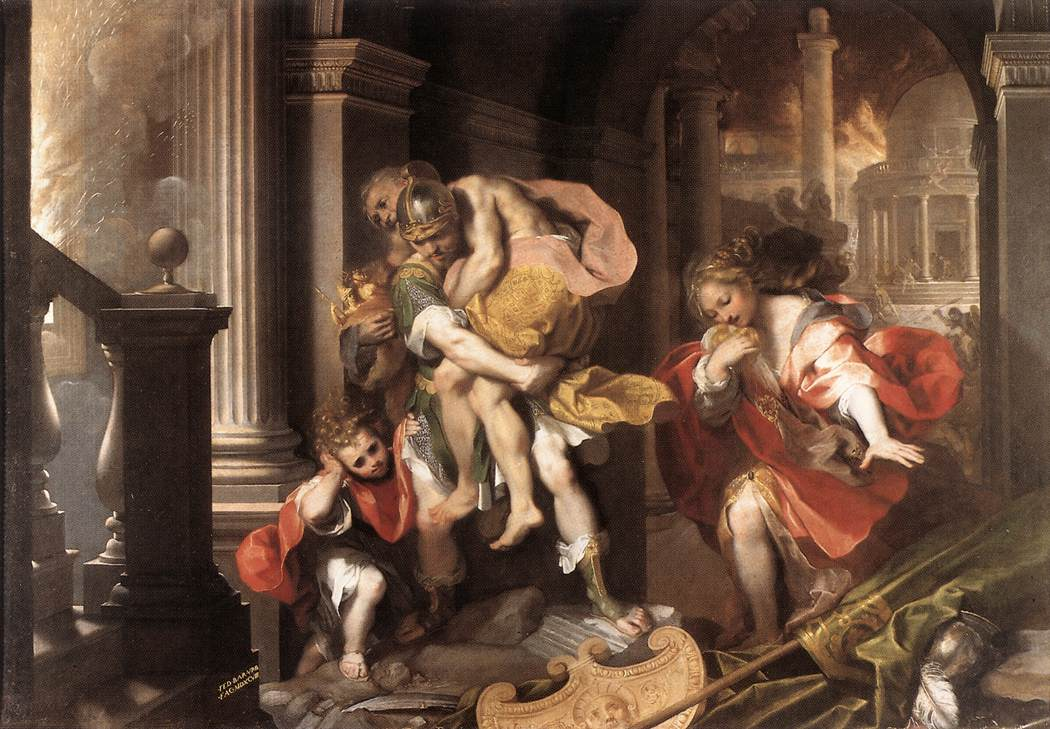
Aeneas flees burning Troy, Federico Barocci, 1598 (Galleria Borghese, Rome, Italy)

Aeneas (/ɪˈniːəs/ in-EE-əs; Classical Latin: [ae̯ˈneːaːs]; from Ancient Greek: Αἰνείας, romanized: Aineías) was a Trojan hero in Greco-Roman mythology, the son of the Trojan prince Anchises and the Greek goddess Aphrodite (equivalent to the Roman Venus). His father was a first cousin of King Priam of Troy (both being great-grandsons of Tros, founder of Troy), making Aeneas a second cousin to Priam's children (such as Hector and Paris). He is a figure in Greek mythology, appearing in Homer's Iliad. Aeneas receives full treatment in Roman mythology, most extensively in Virgil's Aeneid, where he is cast as an ancestor of Romulus and Remus. He became the first true hero of Rome. Snorri Sturluson identifies him with the Norse god Víðarr of the Æsir.

== Etymology ==
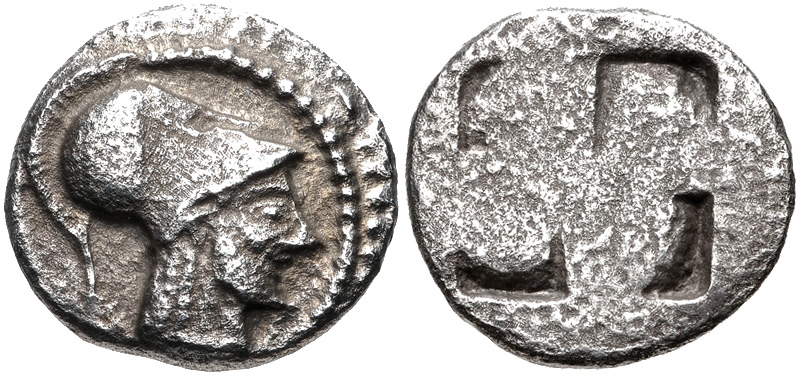
Coinage of Aenea, with portrait of Aeneas. c. 510–480 BCE.

Aeneas is the Romanization of the hero's original Greek name Αἰνείας (Aineías). Aineías is first introduced in the Homeric Hymn to Aphrodite when Aphrodite gives him his name from the adjective αὶνóν (ainon, "terrible"), for the "terrible grief" (αὶνóν ἄχος) he has caused her by being born a mortal who will age and die. (Note: "His name will be Aineias [Aeneas], since it was an unspeakable [ainos] akhos that took hold of me – grief that I had fallen into the bed of a mortal man." (Nagy 2001, 198–99)) It is a popular etymology for the name, apparently exploited by Homer in the Iliad. Later in the Medieval period there were writers who held that, because the Aeneid was written by a philosopher, it is meant to be read philosophically. As such, in the "natural order", the meaning of Aeneas's name combines Greek ennos ("dweller") with demas ("body"), which becomes ennaios or "in-dweller"—i.e. as a god inhabiting a mortal body. However, there is no certainty regarding the origin of his name.

=== Epithets ===
In imitation of the Iliad, Virgil borrows epithets of Homer, including: Anchisiades, magnanimum, magnus, heros, and bonus. Though he borrows many, Virgil gives Aeneas two epithets of his own, in the Aeneid: pater and pius. The epithets applied by Virgil are an example of an attitude different from that of Homer, for whilst Odysseus is poikilios ("wily"), Aeneas is described as pius ("pious"), which conveys a strong moral tone. The purpose of these epithets seems to enforce the notion of Aeneas's divine hand as father and founder of the Roman race, and their use seems circumstantial: when Aeneas is praying he refers to himself as pius, and is referred to as such by the author only when the character is acting on behalf of the gods to fulfill his divine mission. Likewise, Aeneas is called pater ("father") when acting in the interest of his men.

== Greek myth and epos ==
=== Theogony and Homeric Hymn to Aphrodite ===
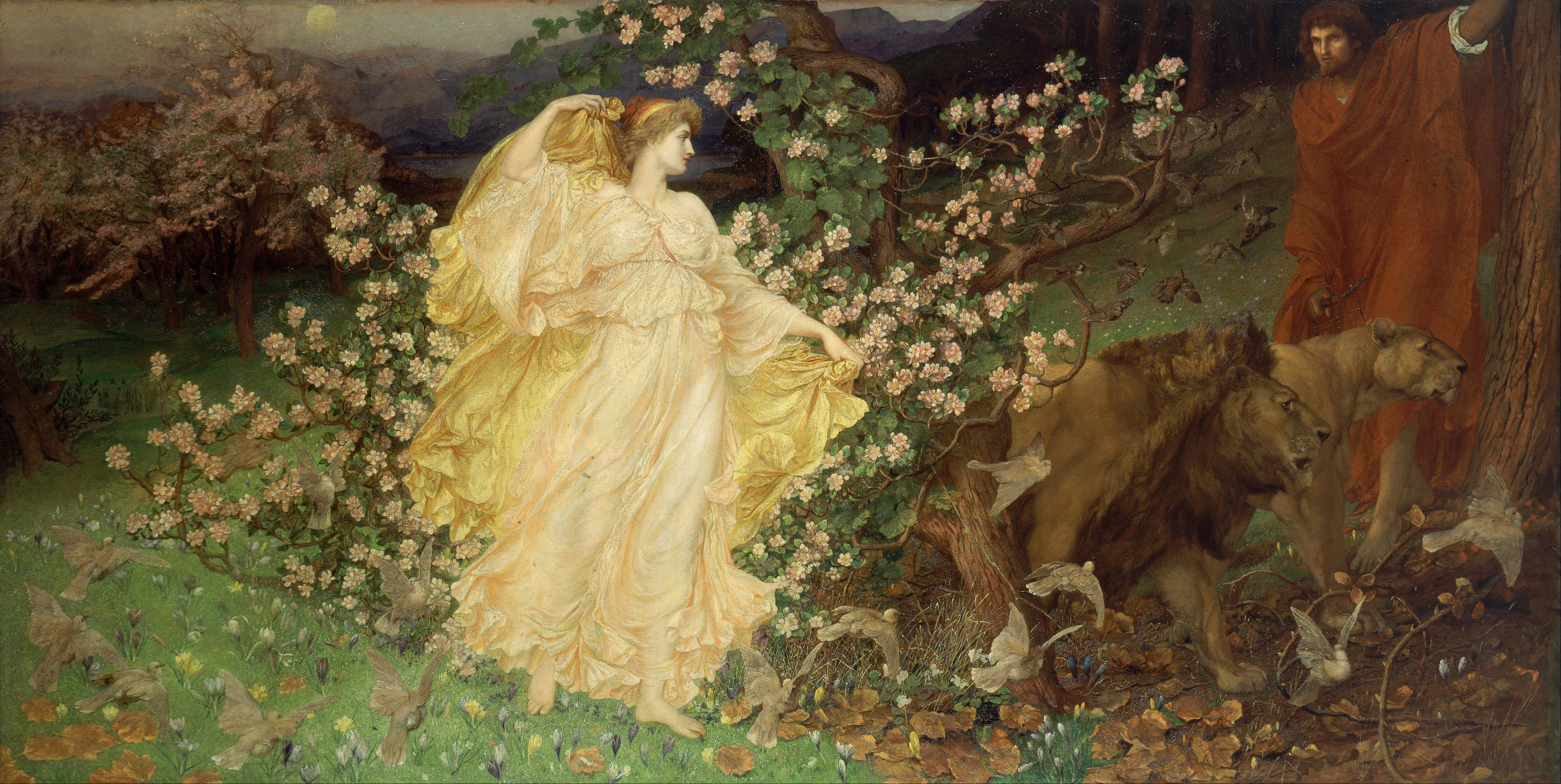
Venus and Anchises by William Blake Richmond (1889 or 1890)

Hesiod's Theogony states that Aphrodite united with Anchises and bore Aeneas on Mount Ida.

The Homeric Hymn to Aphrodite, one of the major Homeric Hymns, gives a detailed narrative about this story. Aphrodite has caused Zeus the king of the Gods to fall in love with mortal women. In retaliation, Zeus decided to put a desire over her heart for the mortal Prince Anchises, who is tending his cattle among the hills near Mount Ida. When Aphrodite saw him, she was immediately smitten. She adorns herself as if for a wedding among the gods and appears before him. He is overcome by her beauty, believing that she is a goddess, but Aphrodite identifies herself as a Phrygian princess. After they have sex, Aphrodite reveals her true identity to him and Anchises fears what might happen to him as a result of their liaison. Aphrodite assures him that he will be protected and tells him that she will bear him a son to be called Aeneas. However, she warns him that he must never tell anyone that he has lain with a goddess. When Aeneas is born, Aphrodite takes him to the nymphs of Mount Ida, instructing them to raise the child to age five, then take him to Anchises. According to other sources, Anchises later brags about his encounter with Aphrodite, and as a result is struck in the foot with a thunderbolt by Zeus. Thereafter he is lame in that foot, so that Aeneas has to carry him from the flames of Troy.

=== Homer's Iliad ===
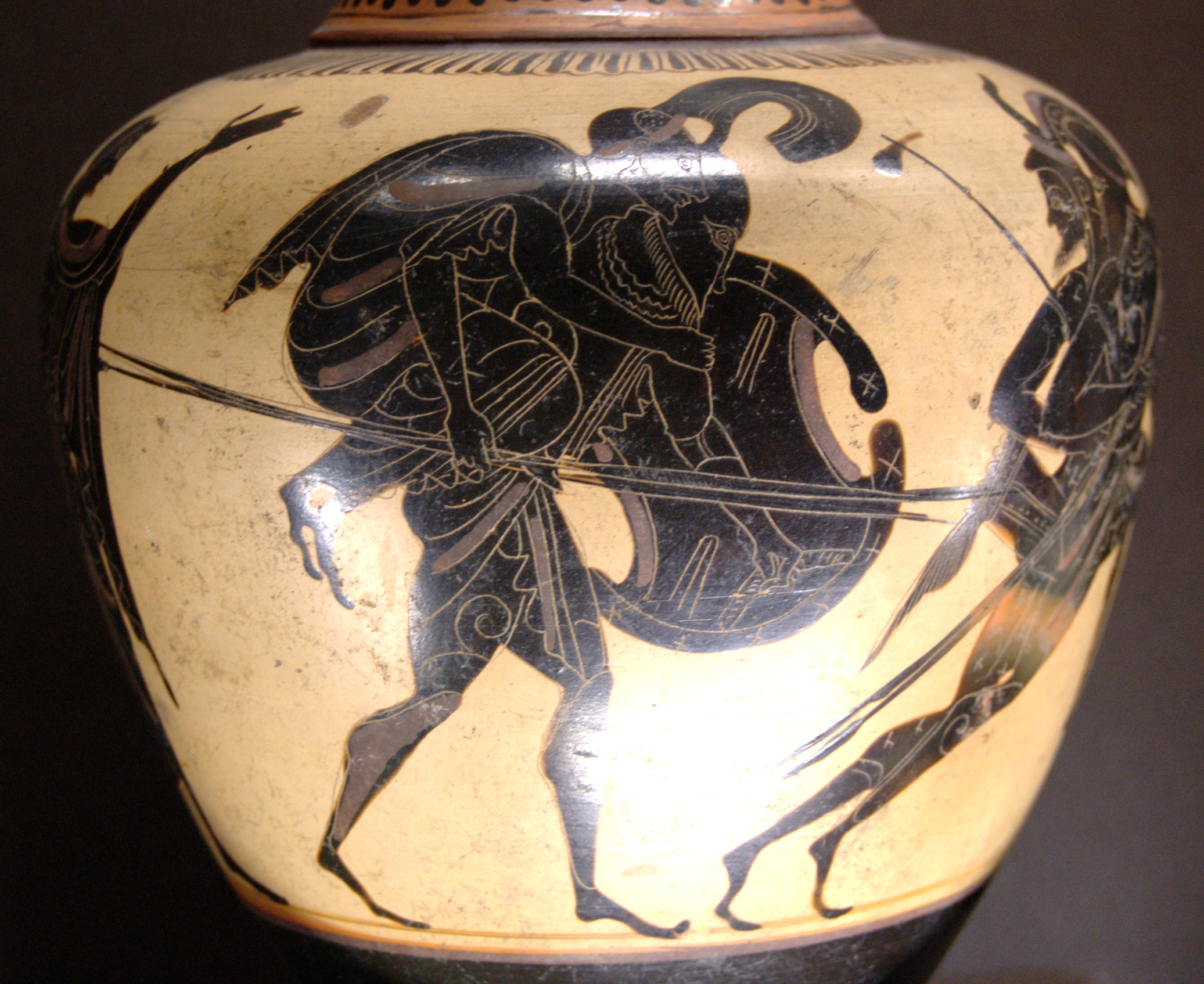
Aeneas carrying Anchises, black-figured oinochoe, c. 520–510 BCE, Louvre (F 118)

Aeneas is a minor character in the Iliad, where he is twice saved from death by the gods as if for an as-yet-unknown destiny but is an honorable warrior in his own right. Having held back from the fighting, aggrieved with Priam because in spite of his brave deeds he was not given his due share of honor, he leads an attack against Idomeneus to recover the body of his brother-in-law Alcathous at the urging of Deiphobus. He is the leader of the Trojans' Dardanian allies, as well as a third cousin and principal lieutenant of Hector, son and heir of the Trojan king Priam.

Aeneas's mother Aphrodite comes to his aid on the battlefield, and he is a favorite of Apollo. Aphrodite and Apollo rescue Aeneas from combat with Diomedes of Argos, who nearly kills him, and carry him away to Pergamos for healing. Even the Sea God Poseidon, who usually favors the Greeks, comes to Aeneas's rescue after he falls under the assault of Achilles, noting that Aeneas, though from a junior branch of the royal family, is destined to become king of the Trojan people.

Bruce Louden presents Aeneas as an archetype: The sole virtuous individual (or family) spared from general destruction, following the mytheme of Utnapishtim, Baucis and Philemon, Noah, and Lot. Pseudo-Apollodorus in his Bibliotheca explains that "...the Greeks [spared] him alone, on account of his piety." Heinrich Schliemann wrote that it seemed "extremely probable that, at the time of Homer's visit [to the Troad], the King of Troy declared that his race was descended in a direct line from Æneas."

=== Other sources ===
The Roman mythographer Gaius Julius Hyginus (c. 64 BCE – CE 17) in his Fabulae credits Aeneas with killing 28 enemies in the Trojan War. Aeneas also appears in the Trojan narratives attributed to Dares Phrygius and Dictys of Crete.

== Roman myth and literature ==
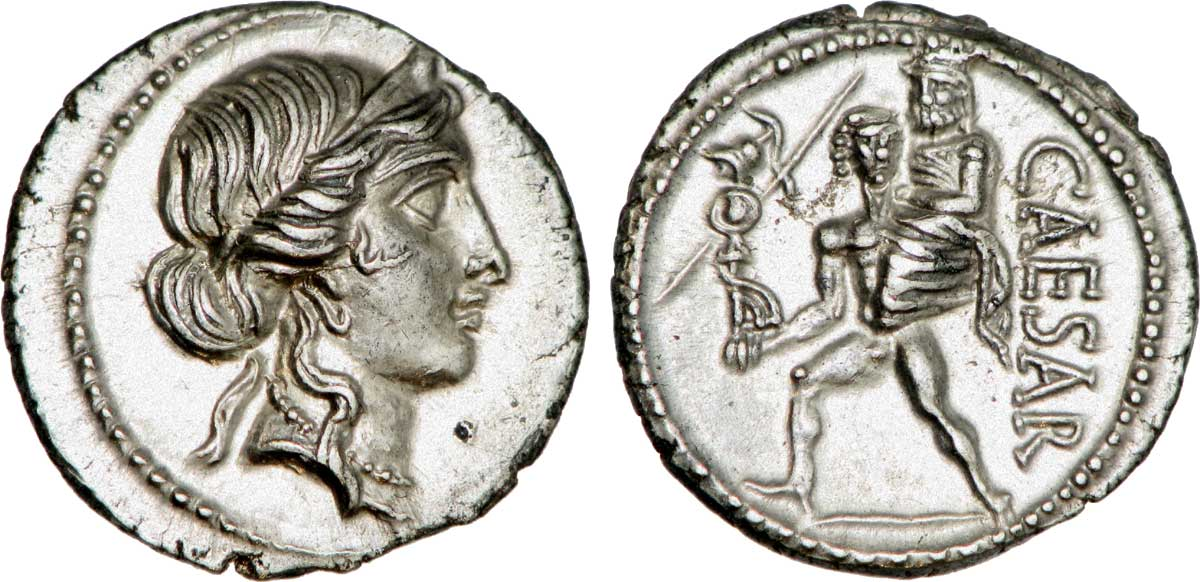
Aeneas and Anchises

The history of Aeneas was continued by Roman authors. One influential source was the account of Rome's founding in Cato the Elder's Origines. The Aeneas legend was well known in Virgil's day and appeared in various historical works, including the Roman Antiquities of the Greek historian Dionysius of Halicarnassus (relying on Marcus Terentius Varro), Ab Urbe Condita by Livy (probably dependent on Quintus Fabius Pictor, fl. 200 BCE), and Gnaeus Pompeius Trogus (now extant only in an epitome by Justin).

=== Virgil's Aeneid ===
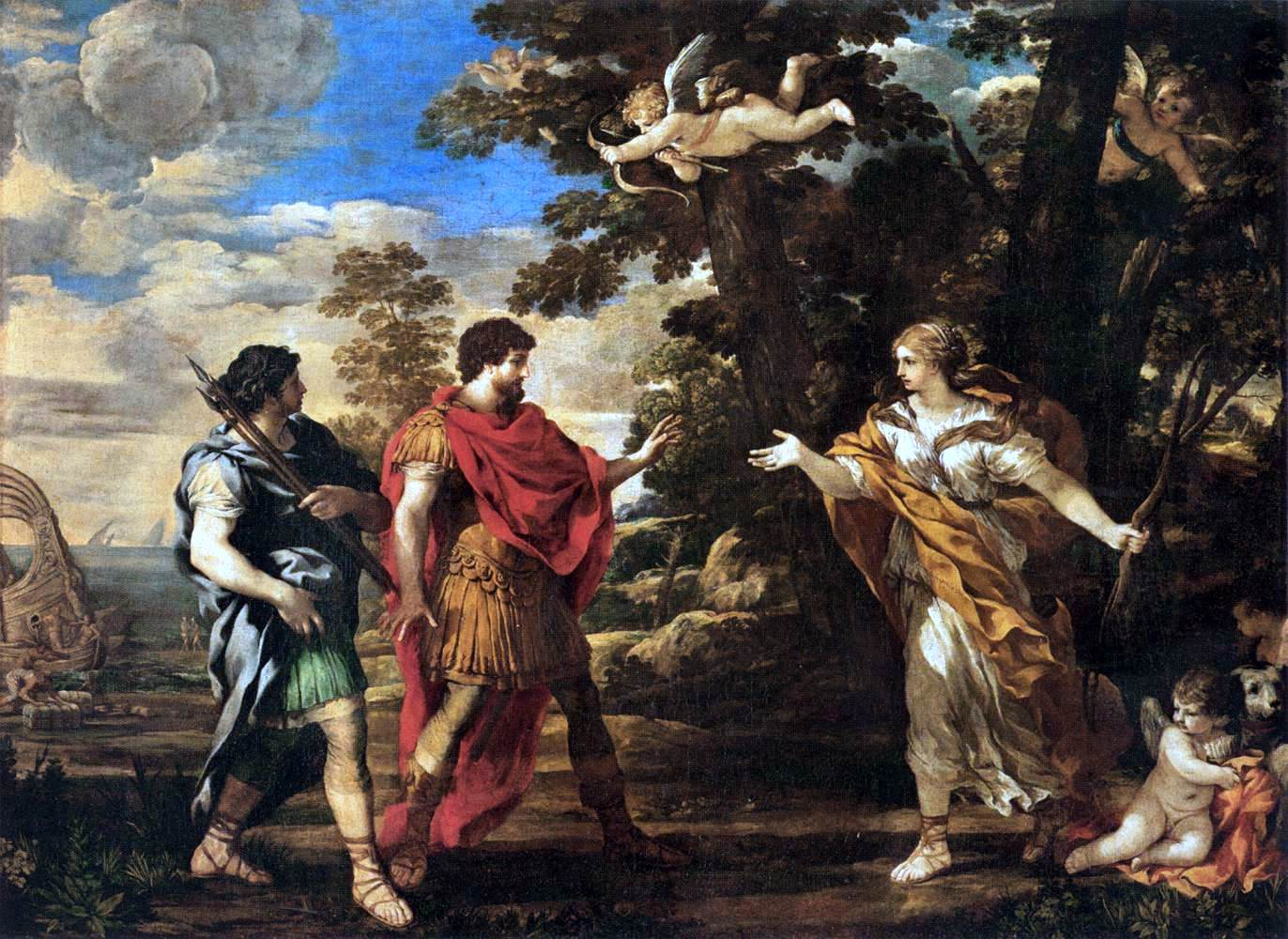
Venus as Huntress Appears to Aeneas, by Pietro da Cortona

The Aeneid which is 12 books of the legendary foundation of Lavinium which explains that Aeneas is one of the few Trojans who were not killed or enslaved when Troy fell. Aeneas, after being commanded by the gods to flee, gathered a group, collectively known as the Aeneads, who then traveled to Italy and became progenitors of the Romans. The Aeneads included Aeneas's trumpeter Misenus, his father Anchises, his friends Achates, Sergestus, and Acmon, the healer Iapyx, the helmsman Palinurus, and his son Ascanius (also known as Iulus, Julus, or Ascanius Julius). He carried with him the Lares and Penates, the statues of the household gods of Troy, and transplanted them to Italy.

Several attempts to find a new home failed; one such stop was on Sicily, where in Drepanum, on the island's western coast, his father, Anchises, died peacefully.

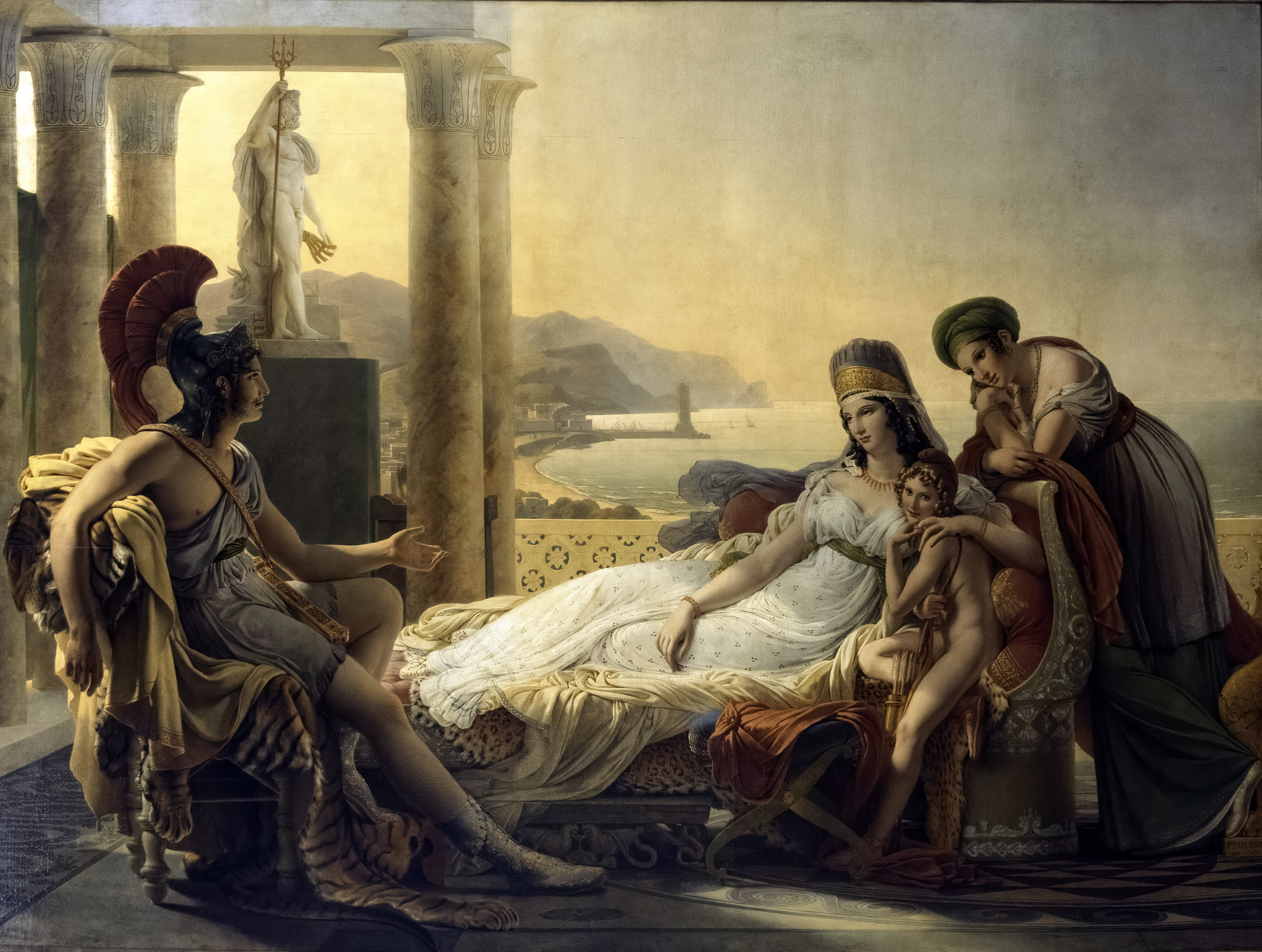
Aeneas tells Dido about the fall of Troy, by Pierre-Narcisse Guérin

After a brief but fierce storm sent up against the group at Juno's request, Aeneas and his fleet made landfall at Carthage after six years of wanderings. Aeneas had a year-long affair with the Carthaginian queen Dido (also known as Elissa), who proposed that the Trojans settle in her land and that she and Aeneas reign jointly over their peoples. A marriage of sorts was arranged between Dido and Aeneas at the instigation of Juno, who was told that her favorite city would eventually be defeated by the Trojans' descendants. Aeneas's mother Venus (the Roman adaptation of Aphrodite) realized that her son and his company needed a temporary respite to reinforce themselves for the journey to come. However, the messenger god Mercury (the adaptation of Hermes) was sent by Jupiter (who was Zeus in this version) and Venus to remind Aeneas of his journey and his purpose, compelling him to leave secretly. When Dido learned of this, she uttered a curse that would forever pit Carthage against Rome, an enmity that would culminate in the Punic Wars. She then committed suicide by stabbing herself with the same sword she gave Aeneas when they first met, burning herself on a funeral pyre with all the things Aeneas gave her.

After the sojourn in Carthage, a storm forced the Trojans to land at Sicily, where Aeneas organized funeral games to honor his father, who had died a year before. The company traveled on and landed on the western coast of Italy. Aeneas descended into the underworld where he met Dido, who turned away from him to return to her husband, and his father, who showed him the future of his descendants and thus the history of Rome.

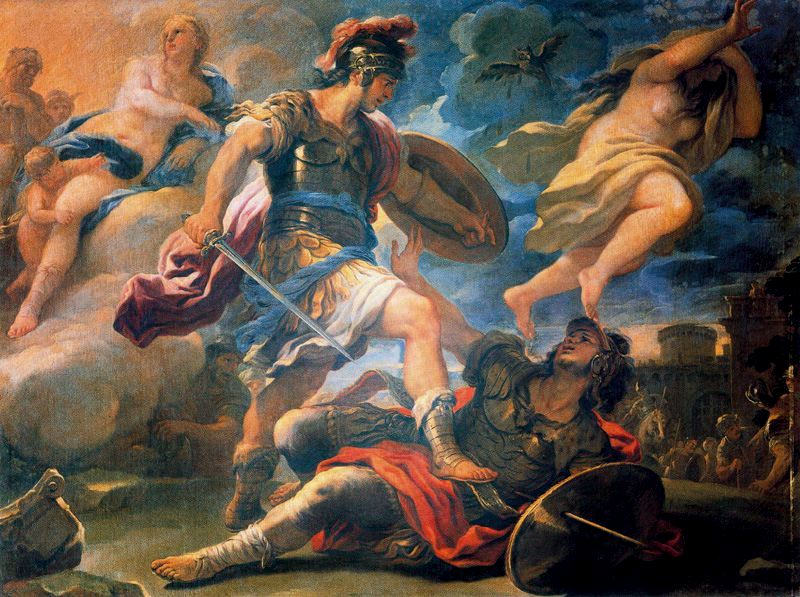
Aeneas defeats Turnus, by Luca Giordano, 1634–1705. The genius of Aeneas is shown ascendant, looking into the light of the future, while that of Turnus is setting, shrouded in darkness.

Latinus, king of the Latins, welcomed Aeneas's army of exiled Trojans and let them reorganize their lives in Latium. His daughter Lavinia had been promised to Turnus, king of the Rutuli, but Latinus received a prophecy that Lavinia would be betrothed to one from another land – namely, Aeneas. Latinus heeded the prophecy, and Turnus consequently declared war on Aeneas at the urging of Juno, who was aligned with King Mezentius of the Etruscans and Queen Amata of the Latins. Aeneas's forces prevailed. Turnus was killed, and Virgil's account ends abruptly.

=== Other sources ===
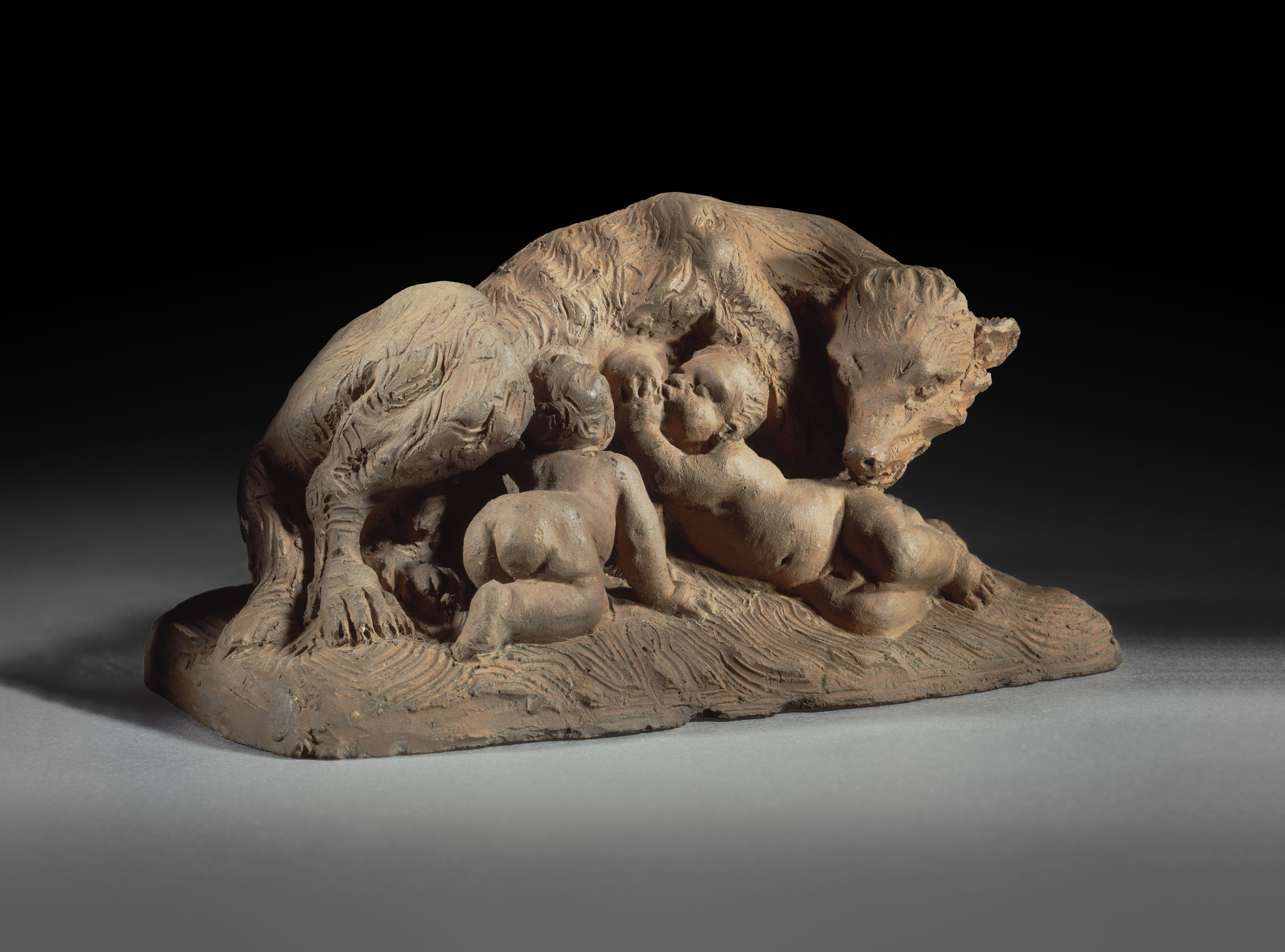
The twin sons Romulus and Remus suckling off of a she-wolf

The rest of Aeneas's biography is gleaned from other ancient sources, including Livy and Ovid's Metamorphoses. According to Livy, Aeneas was victorious, but Latinus died in the war. Aeneas founded the city of Lavinium, named after his wife. He later welcomed Dido's sister, Anna Perenna, who then committed suicide after learning of Lavinia's jealousy. After Aeneas's death, Venus asked Jupiter to make her son immortal. Jupiter agreed. The river god Numicus cleansed Aeneas of all his mortal parts and Venus anointed him with ambrosia and nectar, making him a god. Aeneas was recognized as the god Jupiter Indiges. Aeneas is also an ancestor of the founders of Rome, the twin brothers Romulus and Remus, the two orphan boys who are seen being suckled by a she-wolf.

== English mythology ==
The Brut Chronicle tells the story of Britain's settling by Brutus of Troy, son of Aeneas. Belief in this story was once widespread, but by the time of the Renaissance, it had begun to fade. One surviving version of the Brut Chronicle is a late Middle Ages manuscript known as the St Albans Chronicle.

== Medieval accounts ==
Snorri Sturlason, in the Prologue of the Prose Edda, tells of the world as parted in three continents: Africa, Asia and the third part called Europe or Enea. Snorri also tells of a Trojan named Munon (or Mennon), who marries the daughter of the High King (Yfirkonungr) Priam called Troan and travels to distant lands, marries the Sybil and got a son, Tror, who, as Snorri tells, is identical to Thor. This tale resembles some episodes of the Aeneid. Continuations of Trojan matter in the Middle Ages had their effects on the character of Aeneas as well. The 12th-century French Roman d'Enéas addresses Aeneas's sexuality. Though Virgil appears to deflect all homoeroticism onto Nisus and Euryalus, making his Aeneas a purely heterosexual character, in the Middle Ages there was at least a suspicion of homoeroticism in Aeneas. The Roman d'Enéas addresses that charge, when Queen Amata opposes Aeneas's marrying Lavinia.

Medieval interpretations of Aeneas were greatly influenced by both Virgil and other Latin sources. Specifically, the accounts by Dares and Dictys, which were reworked by the 13th-century Italian writer Guido delle Colonne (in Historia destructionis Troiae), colored many later readings. From Guido, for instance, the Pearl Poet and other English writers get the suggestion that Aeneas's safe departure from Troy with his possessions and family was a reward for treason, for which he was chastised by Hecuba. In Sir Gawain and the Green Knight (late 14th century) the Pearl Poet, like many other English writers, employed Aeneas to establish a genealogy for the foundation of Britain, and explains that Aeneas was "impeached for his perfidy, proven most true" (line 4).

== Family and legendary descendants ==
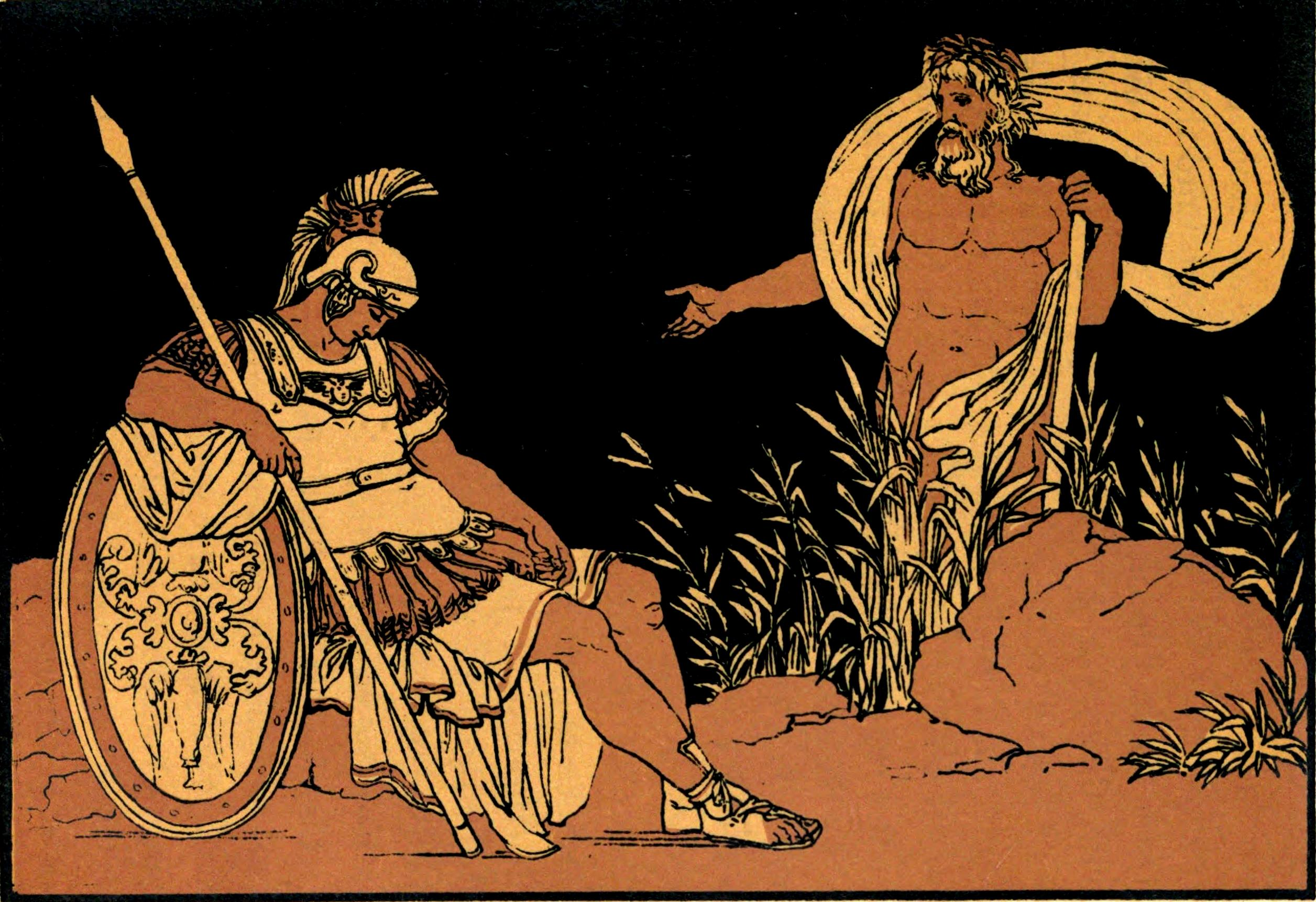
Aeneas and the god Tiber, by Bartolomeo Pinelli

Aeneas had an extensive family tree. His wet-nurse was Caieta, and he is the father of Ascanius with Creusa, and of Silvius with Lavinia. Ascanius, also known as Iulus (or Julius), founded Alba Longa and was the first in a long series of kings. Aeneas is also sometimes said to have a second son by Creusa named Euryleon. According to Strabo, the descendants of the royal family of Scepsis claimed descent from Aeneas. It has been proposed that in both the Hymn to Aphrodite and the Iliad, the praises to Aeneas have been inserted in order to flatter that royal family. According to the mythology used by Virgil in the Aeneid, Romulus and Remus were both descendants of Aeneas through their mother Rhea Silvia, making Aeneas the progenitor of the Roman people. Some early sources call him their father or grandfather, but once the dates of the fall of Troy (1184 BCE) and the founding of Rome (753 BCE) became accepted, authors added generations between them. The Julian family of Rome, most notably Julius Cæsar and Augustus, traced their lineage to Ascanius and Aeneas, thus to the goddess Venus. Through the Julians, the Palemonids make this claim. The legendary kings of Britain – including King Arthur – trace their family through a grandson of Aeneas, Brutus.

== Character and appearance ==
Aeneas's consistent epithet in Virgil and other Latin authors is pius, a term that connotes reverence toward the gods and familial dutifulness. There is significant scholarly debate, however, over the degree to which this epithet is genuine within the poem, and to what extent its deployment by Virgil is sarcastic.

In the Aeneid, Aeneas is described as strong and handsome, but neither his hair colour nor complexion are described. In late antiquity however sources add further physical descriptions. The De excidio Troiae of Dares Phrygius describes Aeneas as "auburn-haired, stocky, eloquent, courteous, prudent, pious, and charming. His eyes were black and twinkling". There is also a brief physical description found in the 6th-century John Malalas' Chronographia: "Aeneas: short, fat, with a good chest, powerful, with a ruddy complexion, a broad face, a good nose, fair skin, bald on the forehead, a good beard."

== Modern portrayals ==
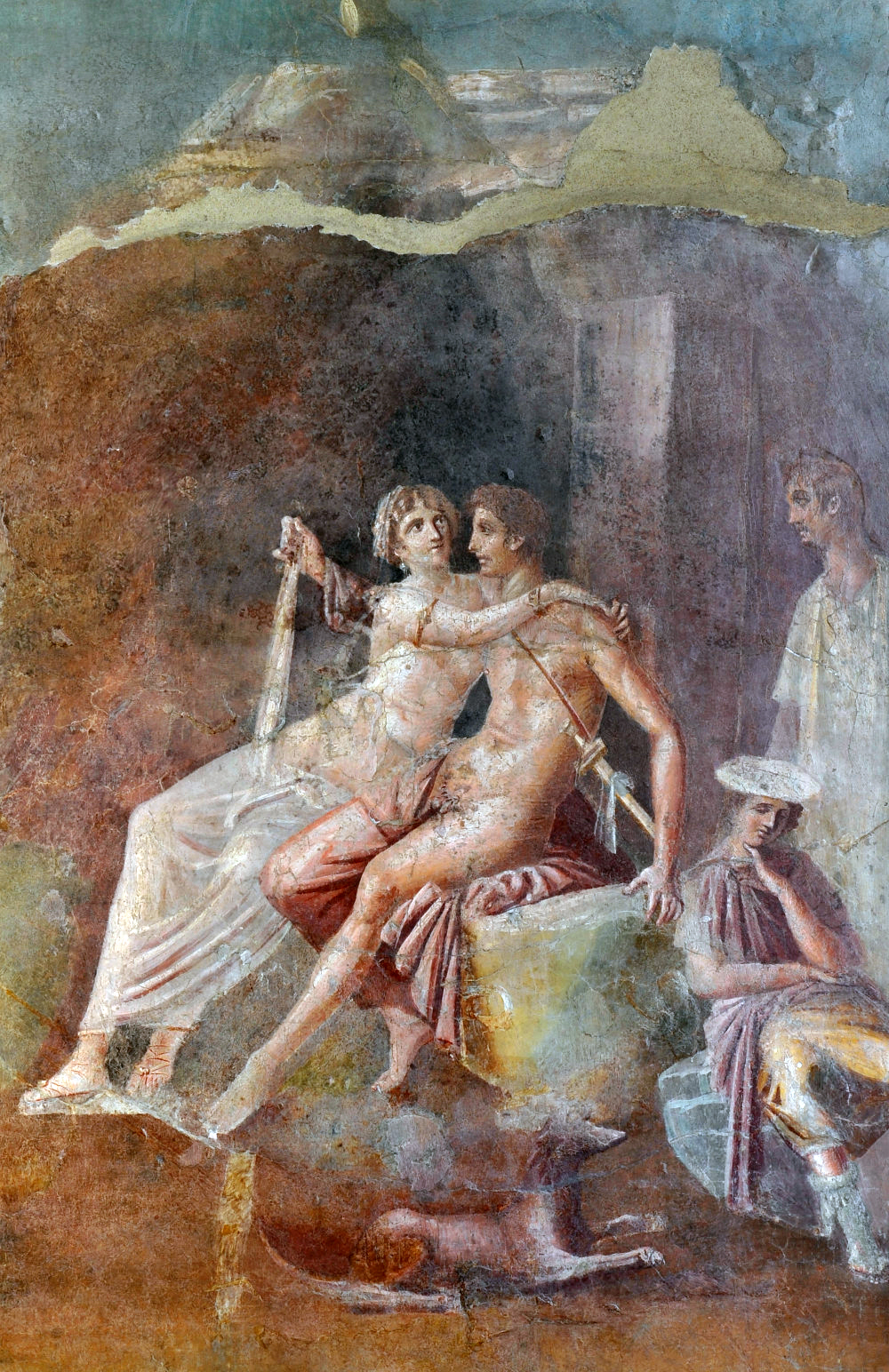
Dido and Aeneas, from a Roman fresco, Pompeian Third Style (10 BCE–45 CE), Pompeii, Italy

=== Literature ===
Aeneas appears as a character in William Shakespeare's play Troilus and Cressida, set during the Trojan War.

Aeneas is a major character in Christopher Marlowe's play Dido, Queen of Carthage.

Aeneas and Dido are the main characters of a 17th-century broadside ballad called "The Wandering Prince of Troy". The ballad ultimately alters Aeneas's fate from traveling on years after Dido's death to joining her as a spirit soon after her suicide.

In modern literature, Aeneas is the speaker in two poems by Allen Tate, "Aeneas at Washington" and "Aeneas at New York". He is a main character in Ursula K. Le Guin's Lavinia, a re-telling of the last six books of the Aeneid told from the point of view of Lavinia, daughter of King Latinus of Latium.

Aeneas appears in David Gemmell's Troy series as a main heroic character who goes by the name Helikaon.

In Rick Riordan's book series The Heroes of Olympus, Aeneas is regarded as the first Roman demigod, son of Venus rather than Aphrodite.

Will Adams's novel City of the Lost assumes that much of the information provided by Virgil is mistaken, and that the true Aeneas and Dido did not meet and love in Carthage but in a Phoenician colony at Cyprus, on the site of the modern Famagusta. Their tale is interspersed with that of modern activists who, while striving to stop an ambitious Turkish Army general trying to stage a coup, accidentally discover the hidden ruins of Dido's palace.

=== Opera, film and other media ===
Lea Desandre performs an aria from Purcell's Dido and Aeneas with Les Arts Florissants in 2020

Aeneas is a title character in Henry Purcell's opera Dido and Aeneas (c. 1688), and Jakob Greber's Enea in Cartagine (Aeneas in Carthage) (1711), and one of the principal roles in Hector Berlioz's opera Les Troyens (c. 1857), as well as in Metastasio's immensely popular opera libretto Didone abbandonata. Canadian composer James Rolfe composed his opera Aeneas and Dido (2007; to a libretto by André Alexis) as a companion piece to Purcell's opera.

Aeneas appears in Kipling's "A Tree Song line.

Despite its many dramatic elements, Aeneas's story has generated little interest from the film industry. Ronald Lewis portrayed Aeneas in Helen of Troy, directed by Robert Wise, as a supporting character, who is a member of the Trojan Royal family, and a close and loyal friend to Paris, and escapes at the end of the film. Portrayed by Steve Reeves, he was the main character in the 1961 sword and sandal film Guerra di Troia (The Trojan War). Reeves reprised the role the following year in the film The Avenger, about Aeneas's arrival in Latium and his conflicts with local tribes as he tries to settle his fellow Trojan refugees there.

Giulio Brogi, portrayed as Aeneas in the 1971 Italian TV miniseries series called Eneide, which gives the whole story of the Aeneid, from Aeneas escape from Troy, to his meeting of Dido, his arrival in Italy, and his duel with Turnus.

The most recent cinematic portrayal of Aeneas was in the film Troy, in which Aeneas (played by Frankie Fitzgerald) appears as a youth charged by Paris to protect the Trojan refugees, and to continue the ideals of the city and its people. Paris gives Aeneas Priam's sword, in order to give legitimacy and continuity to the royal line of Troy – and lay the foundations of Roman culture. In this film, he is not a member of the royal family and does not appear to fight in the war.

In the role-playing game Vampire: The Requiem by White Wolf Game Studios, Aeneas figures as one of the mythical founders of the Ventrue Clan.

in the action game Warriors: Legends of Troy, Aeneas is a playable character. The game ends with him and the Aeneans fleeing Troy's destruction and, spurned by the words of a prophetess thought crazed, goes to a new country (Italy) where he will start an empire greater than Greece and Troy combined that shall rule the world for 1000 years, never to be outdone in the tale of men (the Roman Empire).

In the 2018 TV miniseries Troy: Fall of a City, Aeneas is portrayed by Alfred Enoch. He also featured as an Epic Fighter of the Dardania faction in the Total War Saga: Troy in 2020.

== Depictions in art ==
Scenes depicting Aeneas, especially from the Aeneid, have been the focus of study for centuries. They have been the frequent subject of art and literature since their debut in the 1st century.

=== Villa Valmarana ===
The artist Giovanni Battista Tiepolo was commissioned by Gaetano Valmarana in 1757 to fresco several rooms in the Villa Valmarana, the family villa situated outside Vicenza. Tiepolo decorated the palazzina with scenes from epics such as Homer's Iliad and Virgil's Aeneid.

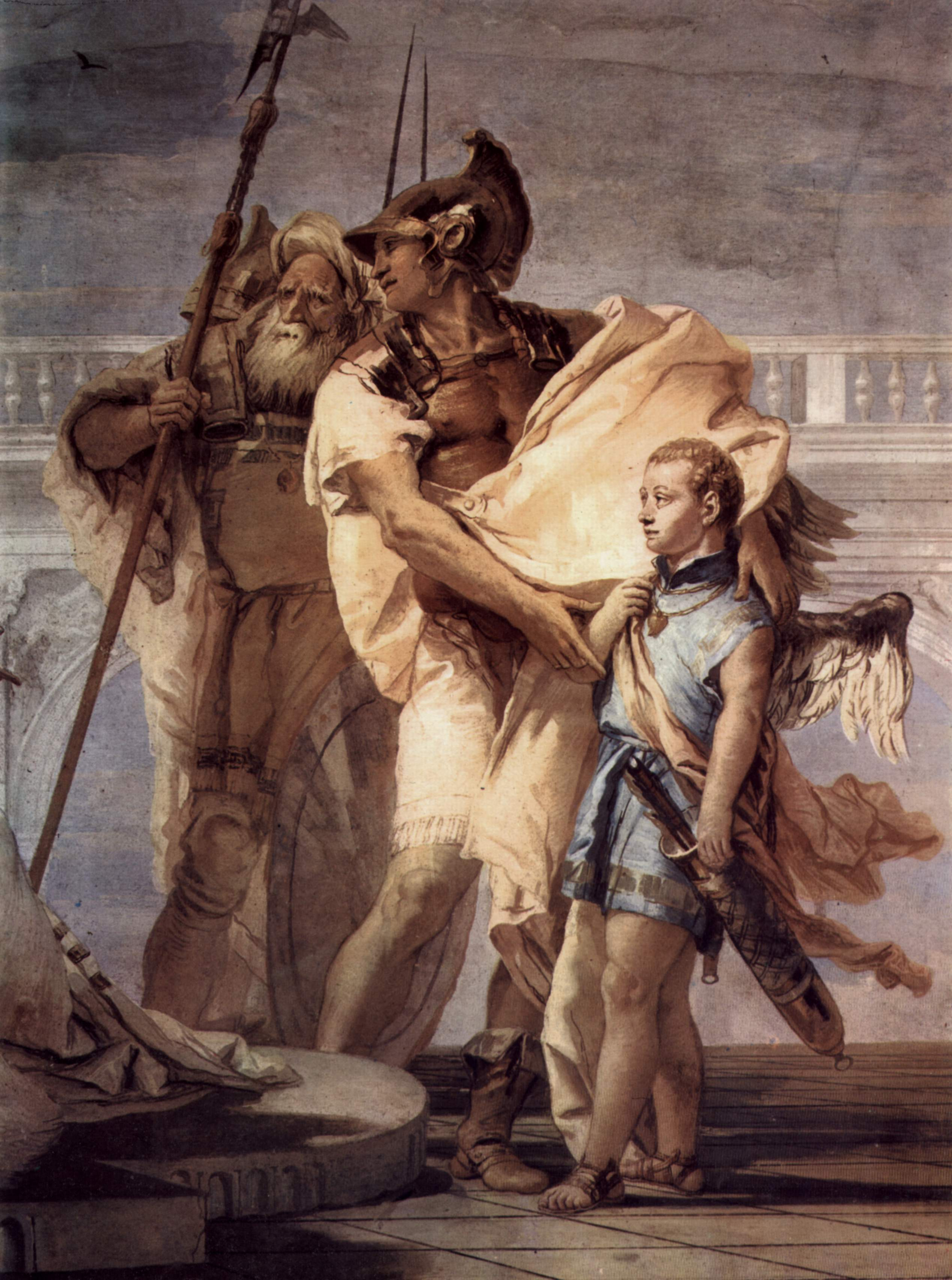
Aeneas Introducing Cupid Dressed as Ascanius to Dido, by Tiepolo (1757).

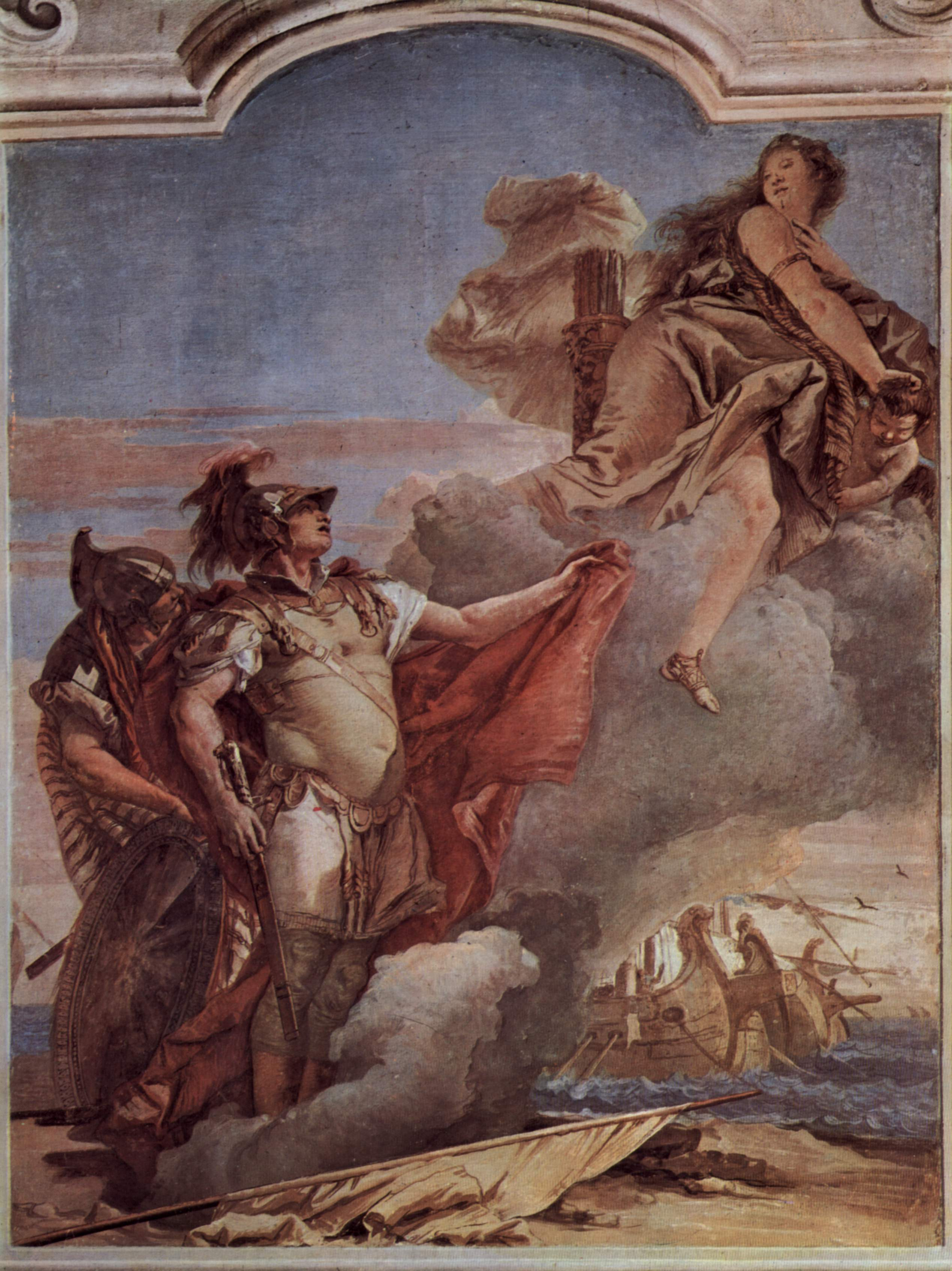
Venus Appearing to Aeneas on the Shores of Carthage, by Tiepolo (1757).

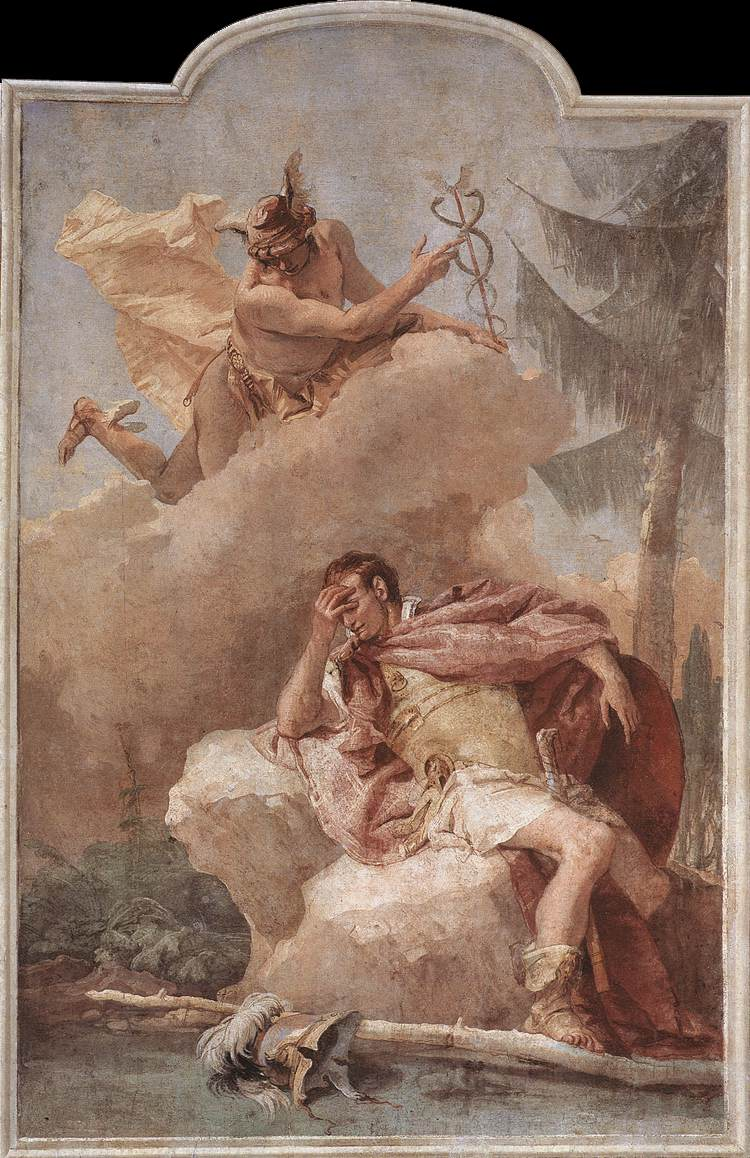
Mercury Appearing to Aeneas, by Tiepolo (1757).

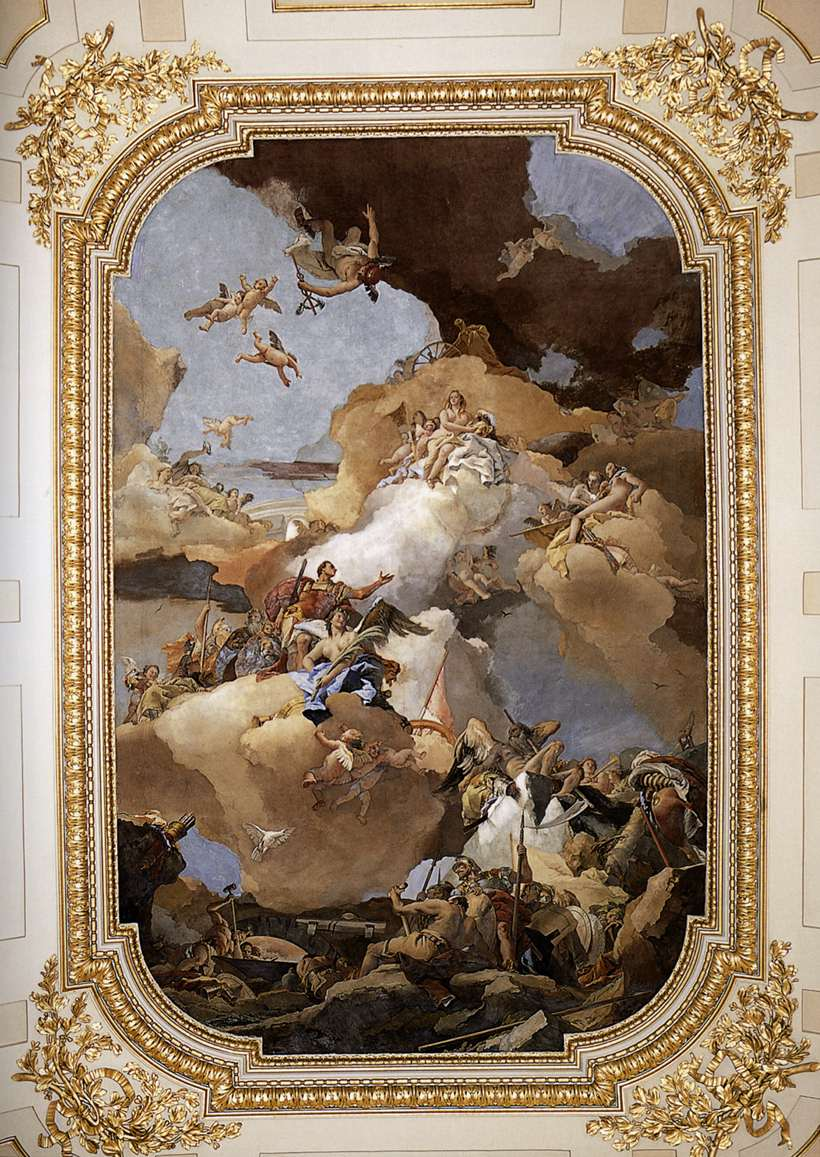
Venus and Vulcan, by Tiepolo (between 1762 and 1766).

=== Aeneas flees Troy ===
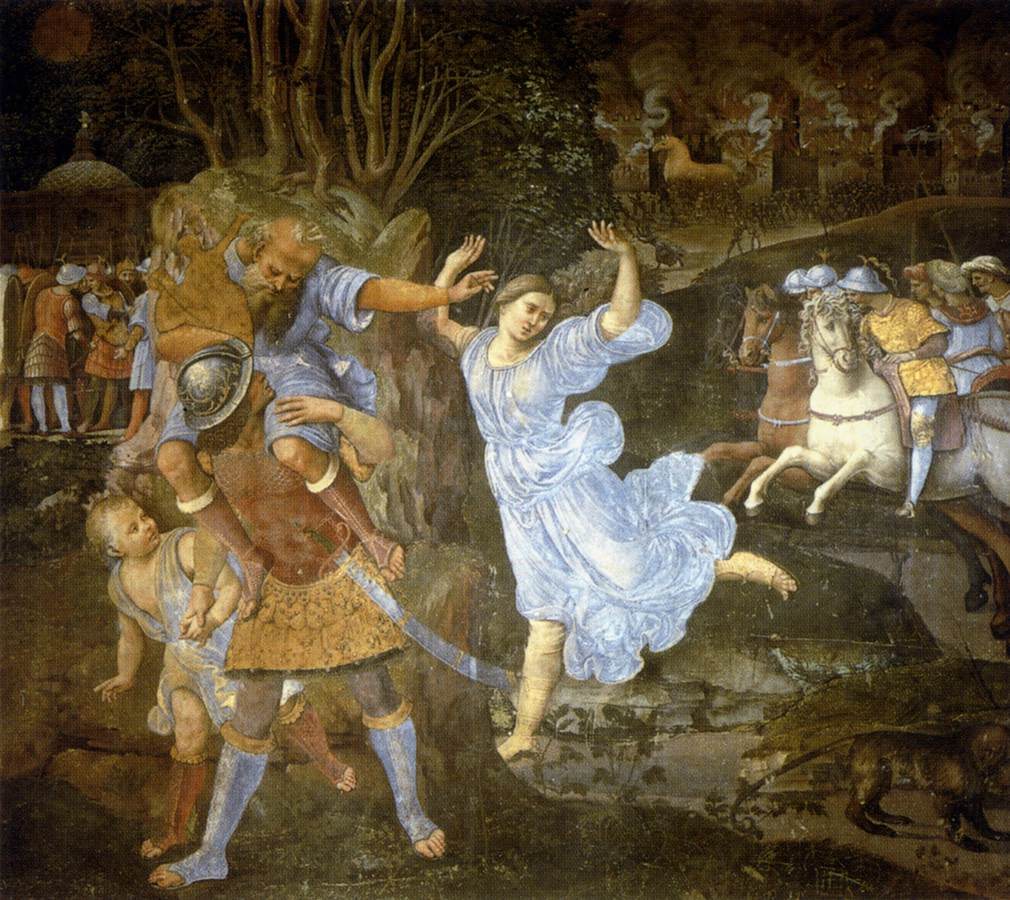
Flight of Aeneas from Troy, by Girolamo Genga (between 1507 and 1510)

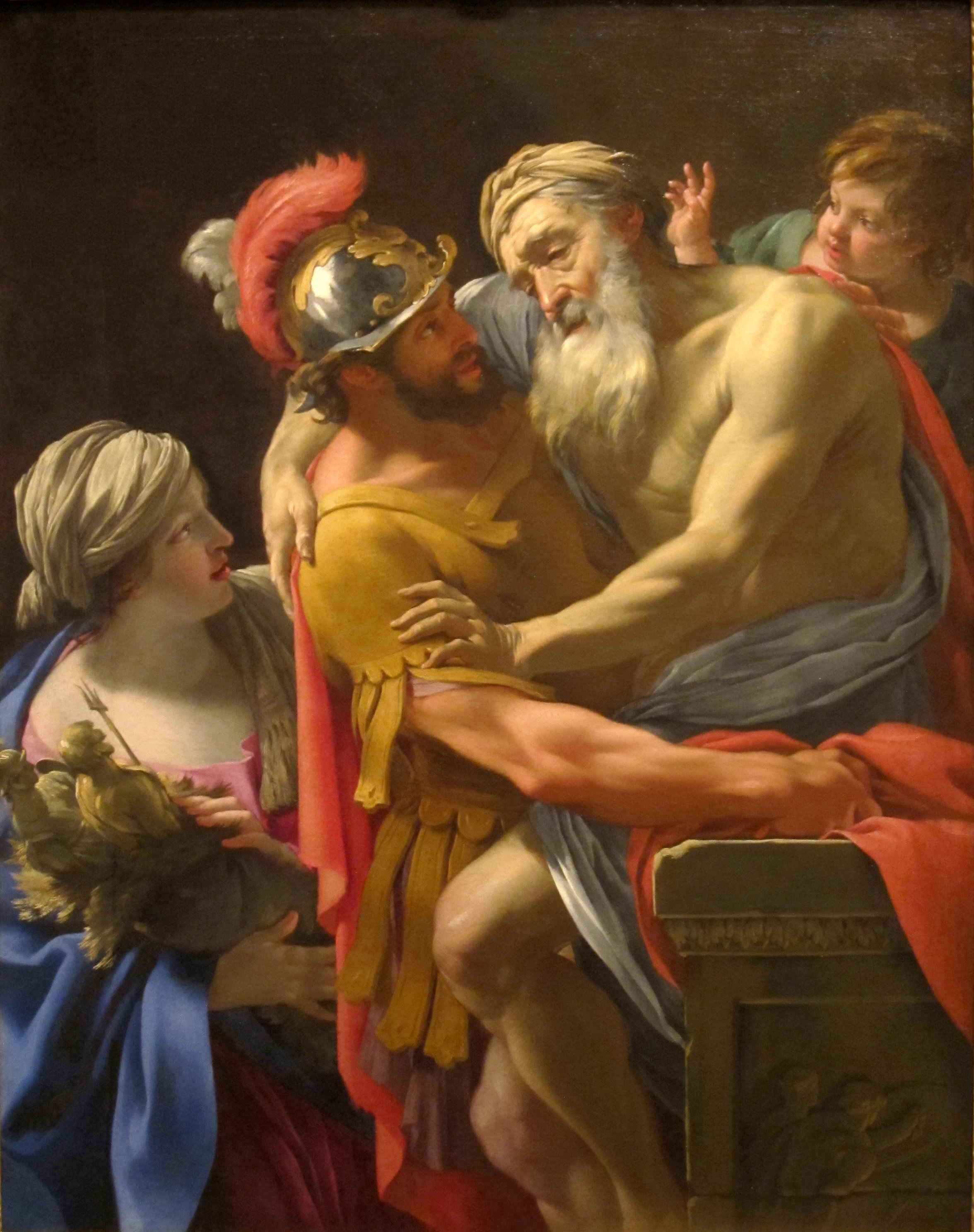
Aeneas and his Father Fleeing Troy, by Simon Vouet (c. 1635)

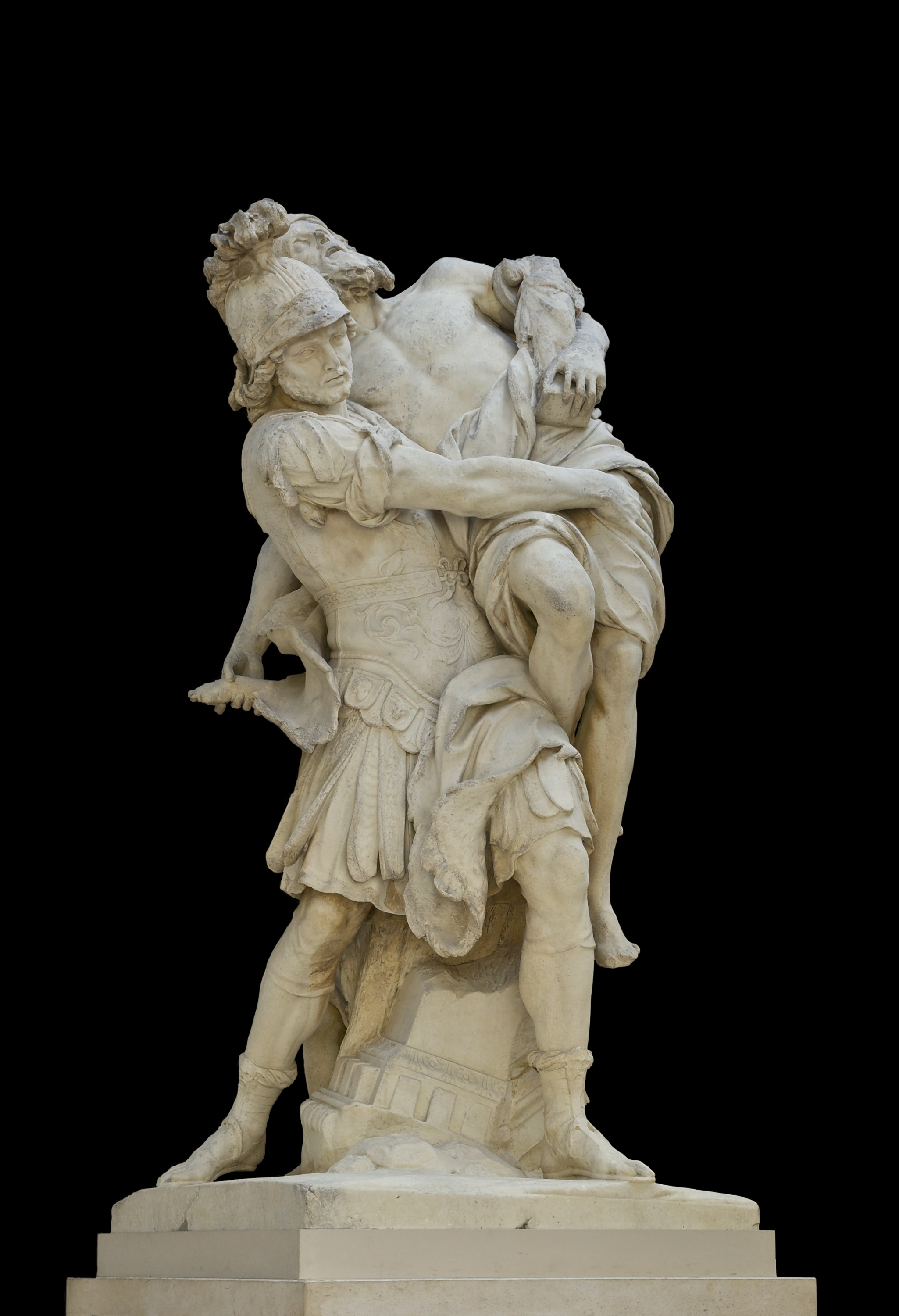
Aeneas & Anchises, by Pierre Lepautre (c. 1697)

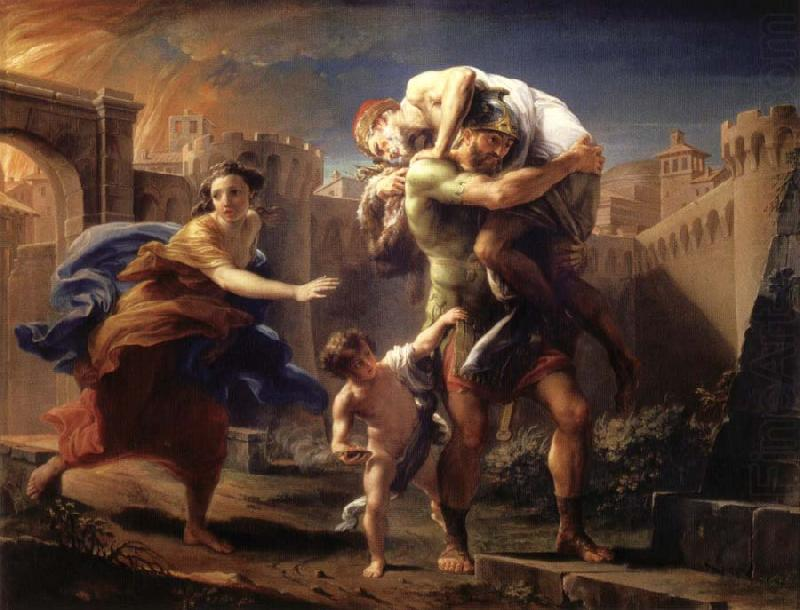
Aeneas fleeing from Troy, by Pompeo Batoni (c. 1750)

=== Aeneas with Dido ===
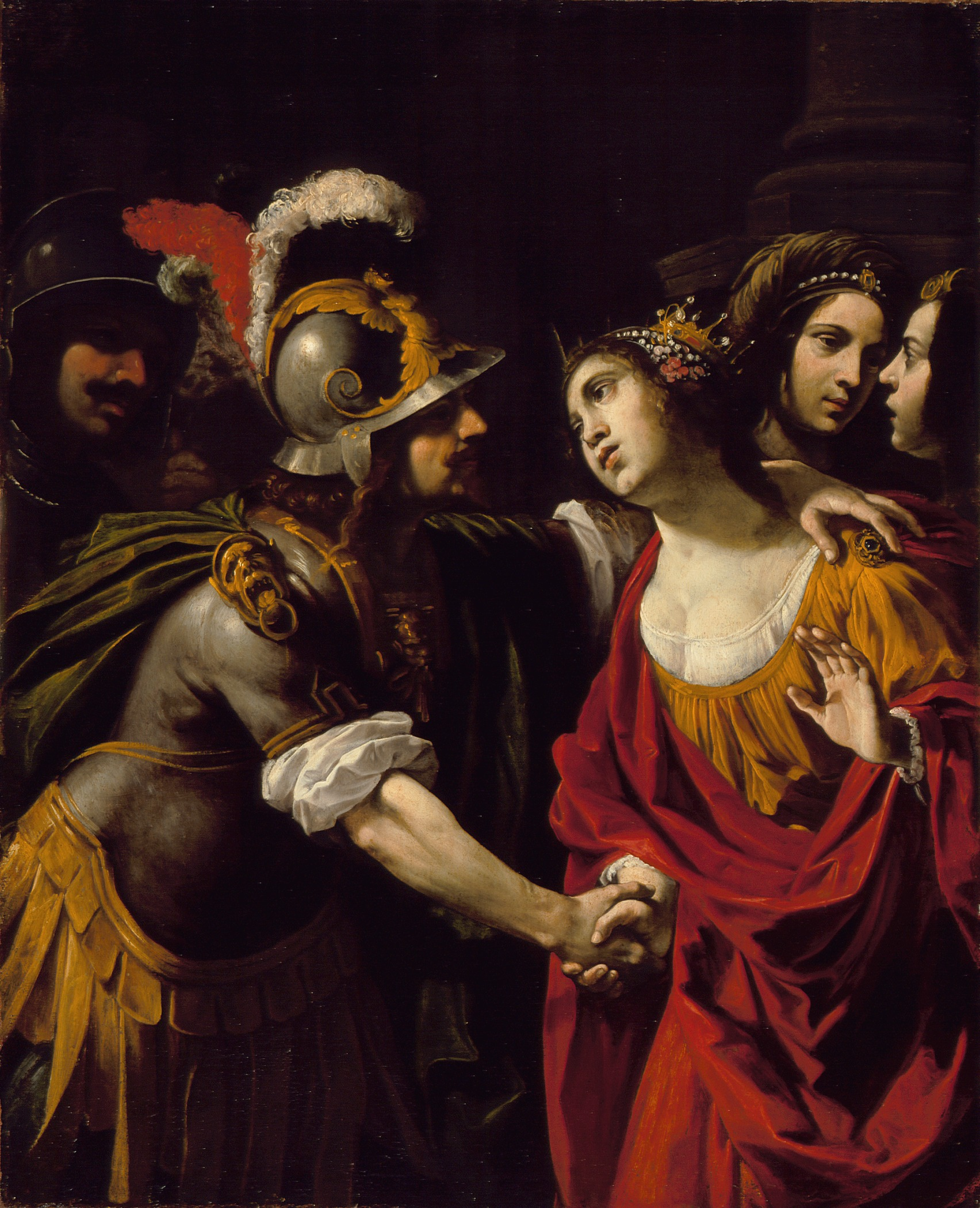
Dido and Aeneas, by Rutilio Manetti (c. 1630)

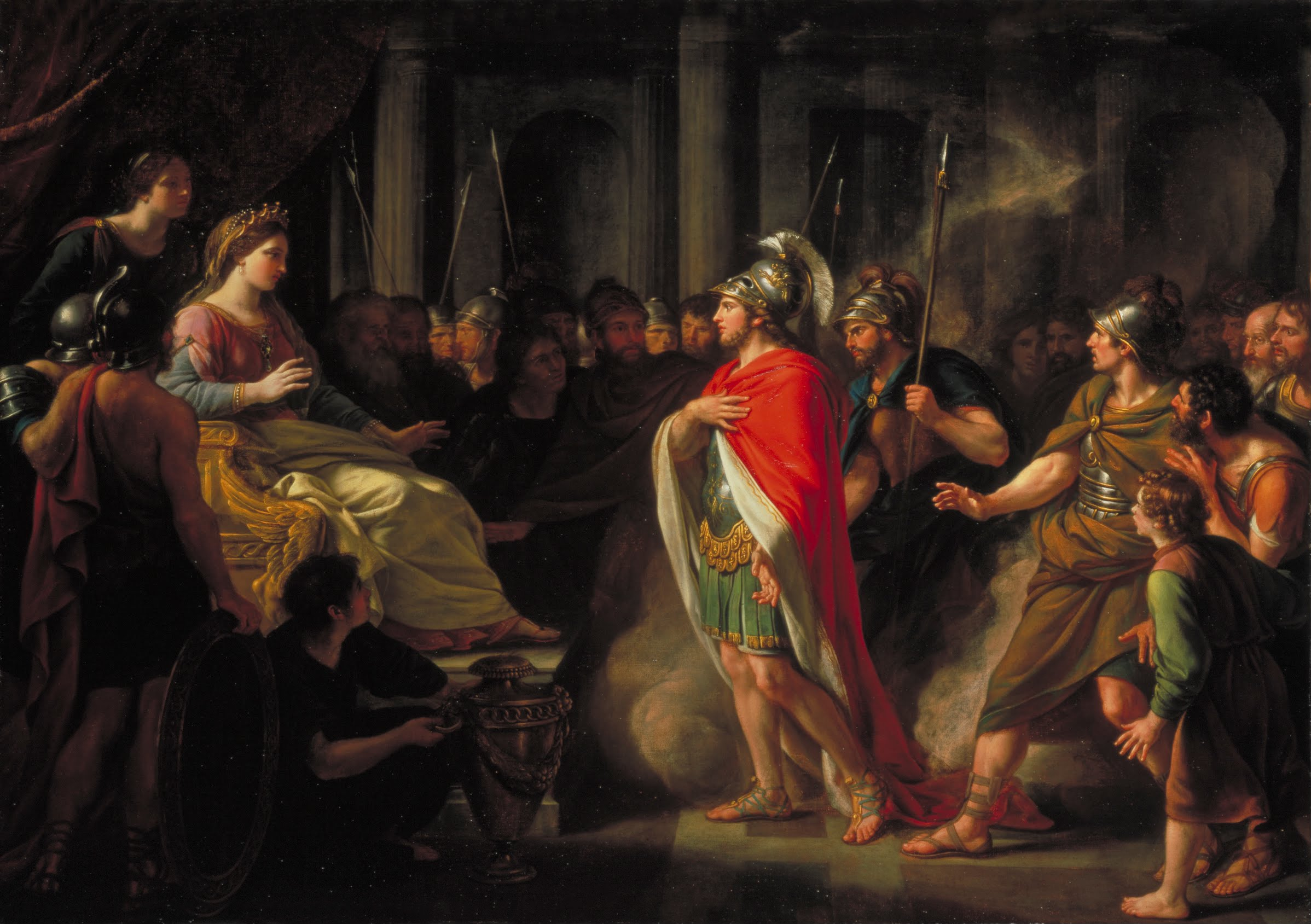
The Meeting of Dido and Aeneas, by Nathaniel Dance-Holland (1766)

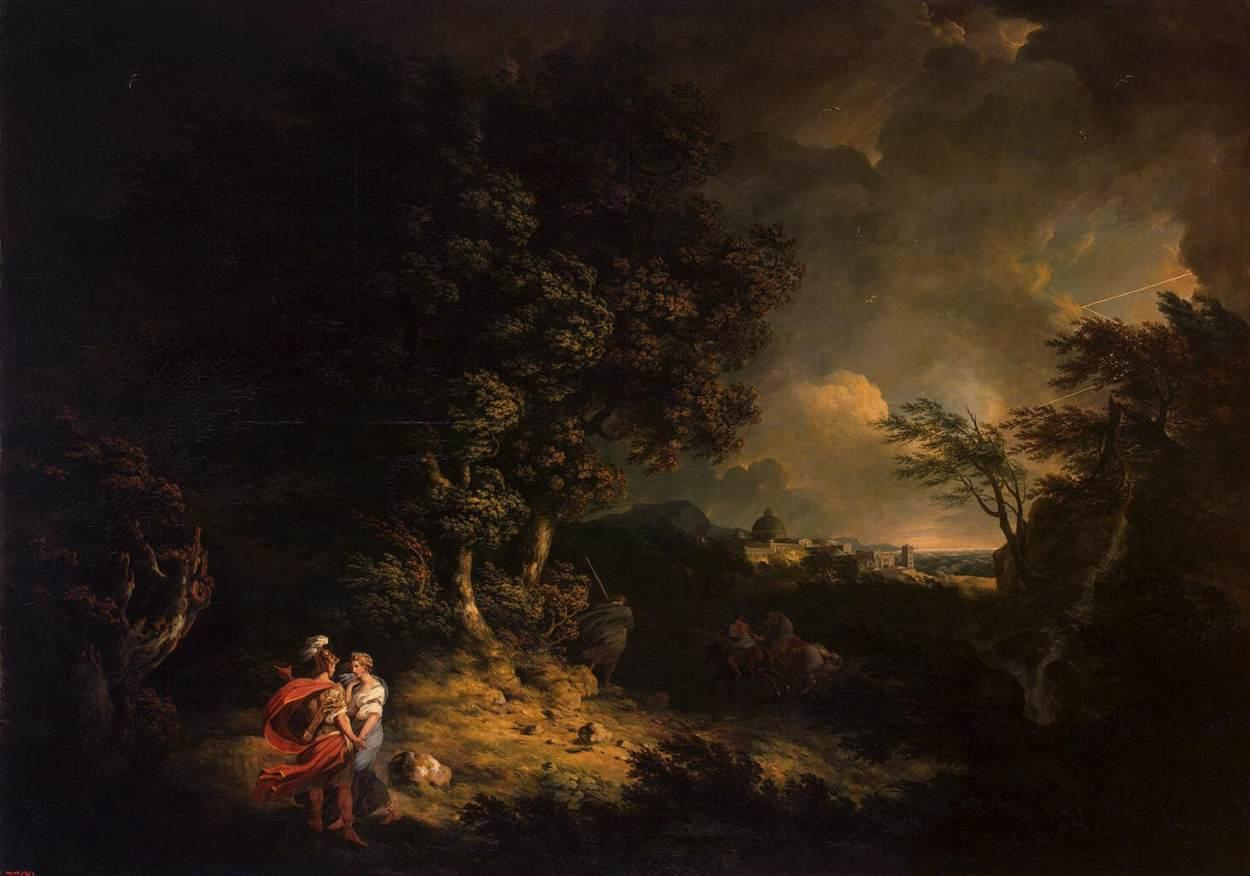
Landscape with Dido and Aeneas, by Thomas Jones (1769)

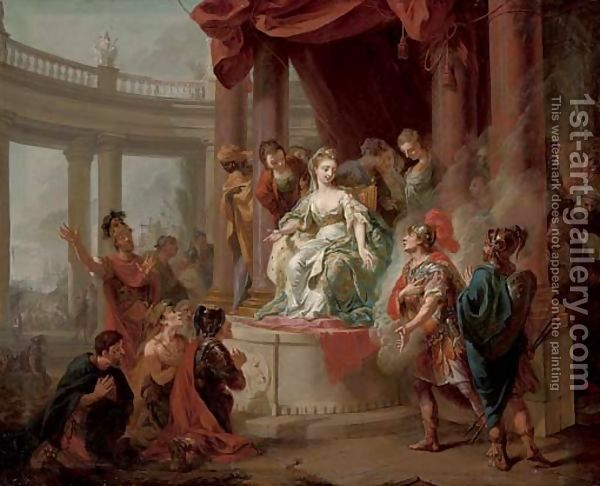
Dido meeting Aeneas, by Johann Heinrich the Elder Tischbein (3 January 1780)

== Family tree ==
Family tree of Aeneas

Oceanus	Tethys
Atlas	Pleione	Scamander	Idaea	Simoeis
Zeus/Jupiter	Electra	Teucer
Dardanus	Batea
Ilus	Erichthonius	Astyoche
Callirrhoe	Tros
Ilus	Ganymede	Assaracus	Hieromneme
Laomedon	Themiste	Capys
Priam	Anchises	Aphrodite/Venus	Latinus
Creusa	Aeneas	Lavinia
Ascanius	Silvius
Aeneas Silvius
Latinus Silvius
Alba
Atys
Capys
Capetus
Tiberinus Silvius
Agrippa
Romulus Silvius
Aventinus
Procas
Numitor	Amulius
Ares/Mars	Rhea Silvia/Ilia
Hersilia	Romulus	Remus

== See also ==
- Cumaean Sibyl
- Lacrimae rerum
- The Golden Bough
- Latin kings of Alba Longa

== Sources ==
- Homer, Iliad II. 819–21; V. 217–575; XIII. 455–544; XX. 75–352.
- Apollodorus, Bibliotheca III. xii. 2; Epitome III. 32–IV. 2; V. 21.
- Virgil, Aeneid.
- Ovid, Metamorphoses XIII. 623–715; XIV. 75–153; 581–608.
- Ovid, Heroides, VII.
- Livy, Book 1.1–2.
- Dictys Cretensis.
- Dares Phrygius.

Legendary titles
Preceded by Latinus	Latin king	Succeeded by Ascanius
