= Seabird (disambiguation) =

Seabirds are birds adapted to a marine life.

Seabird(s) or Sea bird(s) may also refer to:

In music and literature:

- Seabird (band), an American rock band
- "The Seabirds", a song by The Triffids from the album Born Sandy Devotional
- "Seabirds" (song), an unreleased Pink Floyd song written for the soundtrack to More
- Seabird (novel), a 1948 book by Holling Clancy Holling
- "Seabird", a song by the Alessi Brothers from the 1976 album Alessi

Places:

- Sea Bird Island (British Columbia)
- Seabird, Western Australia

In ships and aircraft:

- Sea Bird (ship), an 18th-century merchant ship
- Seabird Half Rater, a classic sailing boat design
- USS Sea Bird (1863), a schooner in the American Civil War
- CSS Sea Bird, a steamer in the Confederate States Navy
- Lakes Sea Bird, a two-seat floatplane built in 1912
- Fleetwings Sea Bird, an American amphibious aircraft of the 1930s
- Seabird Airlines, a Turkish airline

Other:

- Sea-Bird, a Thoroughbred racehorse also known as Sea Bird, Sea-Bird II and Sea Bird II
