= Thomas Fleming Day =

American sailor (1861–1927)

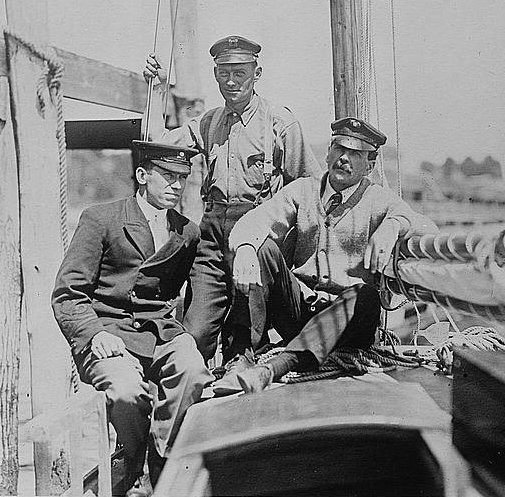
Frederick B. Thurber, Theodore R. Goodwin, and Thomas Fleming Day in 1912

Thomas Fleming Day (1861 – August 19, 1927) was a sailboat designer and sailboat racer. He was the founding editor of The Rudder, a monthly magazine about boats. He was the first to win the annual New York to Bermuda race.

== Biography ==
He was born in Somerset, England, in March 1861, emigrated with his parents to the United States when he was a young boy, and was brought up on Long Island Sound. In 1890, he founded The Rudder, "A monthly journal devoted to aquatic sport and trade," which he edited until April 1916. In 1906 he founded the Newport Bermuda Race as a long-distance oceanic race for small boats and won the first year; the race gives out the Thomas Fleming Day Trophy in his honor. In 1911 he and Frederick B. Thurber and Theodore R. Goodwin sailed the Atlantic Ocean in the Sea Bird. In 1918 he designed the Islander that Harry Pidgeon built and sailed to become the second person to sail around the world.

He died on August 19, 1927, in Harlem, New York.

Day was inducted into the National Sailing Hall of Fame on November 9, 2019.
