= Tenedos =

Island in Turkey

Tenedos Bozcaada
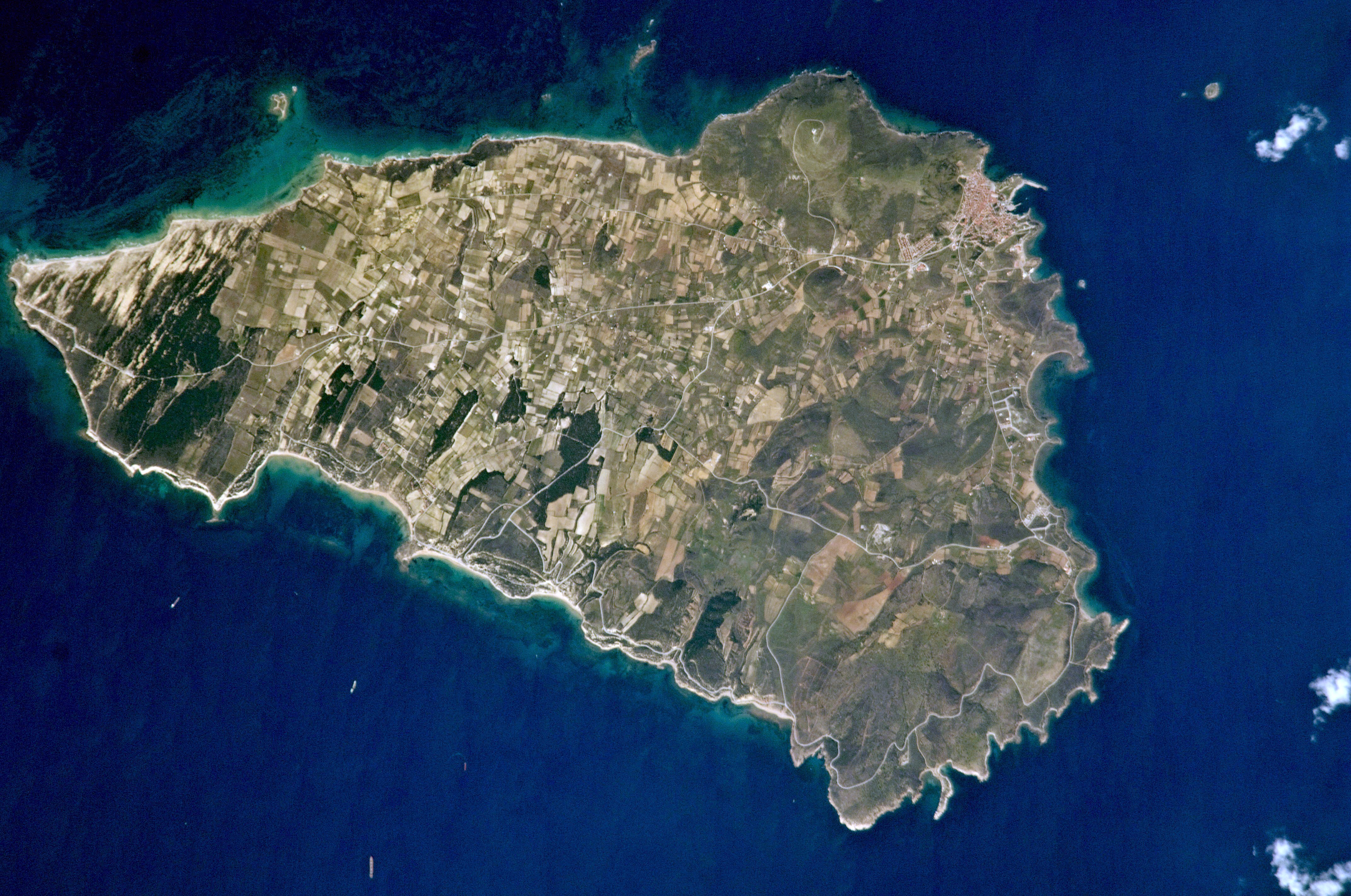
- Satellite view of Bozcaada

- Location within Marmara Location within Turkey Location within Europe
- Coordinates: 39°49′19″N 26°01′44″E
- Country: Turkey
- Region: Marmara
- Province: Çanakkale

Government
  - Mayor: Yahya Göztepe (CHP)
  - Kaymakam: Mehmet Halit Haydaroğlu
- Area: 39.9 km^{2} (15.4 sq mi)
- Population (2022): 3,120
  - Density: 78.2/km^{2} (203/sq mi)
- Post code: 17680
- Website: www.bozcaada.bel.tr

Tenedos (Greek: Τένεδος; pronounced [ˈteneðos]; Latin: Tenedus), or Bozcaada in Turkish, is an island of Turkey in the northeastern part of the Aegean Sea. Administratively, the island constitutes the Bozcaada district of Çanakkale Province. With an area of 39.9 km^{2} (15 sq mi), it is the third-largest Turkish island after Imbros (Gökçeada) and Marmara. In 2022, the district had a population of 3,120 inhabitants. The main industries are tourism, wine production and fishing. The island has been famous for its grapes, wines and red poppies for centuries. It is a former bishopric and presently a Latin Catholic titular see.

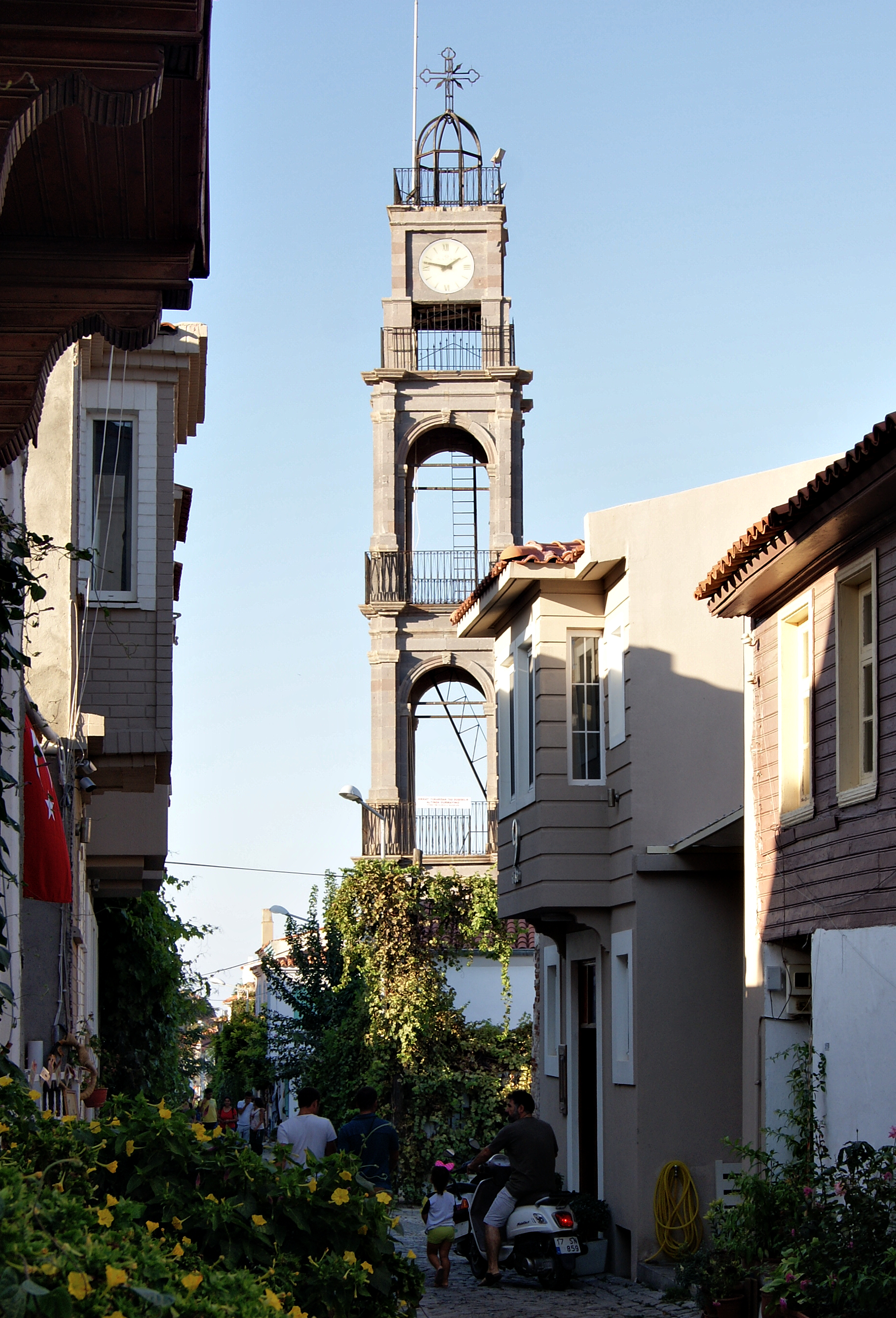
Bozcaada Clock Tower

Tenedos is mentioned in both the Iliad and the Aeneid, in the latter as the site where the Greeks hid their fleet near the end of the Trojan War in order to trick the Trojans into believing the war was over and into taking the Trojan Horse within their city walls. Despite its small size, the island was important throughout classical antiquity due to its strategic location at the entrance of the Dardanelles. In the following centuries, the island came under the control of a succession of regional powers, including the Persian Empire, the Delian League, the empire of Alexander the Great, the Attalid kingdom, the Roman Empire and its successor, the Byzantine Empire, before passing to the Republic of Venice. As a result of the War of Chioggia (1381) between Genoa and Venice the entire population was evacuated and the town was demolished. The Ottoman Empire established control over the deserted island in 1455. During Ottoman rule, it was resettled by both Greeks and Turks. In 1807, the island was temporarily occupied by the Russians. During this invasion the town was burnt down and many Turkish residents left the island.

Under Greek administration between 1912 and 1923, Tenedos was ceded to Turkey with the Treaty of Lausanne (1923) which ended the Turkish War of Independence following the dissolution of the Ottoman Empire in the aftermath of World War I. The treaty called for a quasi-autonomous administration to accommodate the local Greek population and excluded the Greeks on the two islands of Imbros and Tenedos from the wider population exchanges that took place between Greece and Turkey. Tenedos remained majority Greek until the late 1960s and early 1970s, when many Greeks emigrated because of discriminatory policies and episodes of anti-Greek violence. Starting with the second half of the 20th century, there has been immigration from mainland Anatolia, especially Romani from the town of Bayramiç.

== Name ==
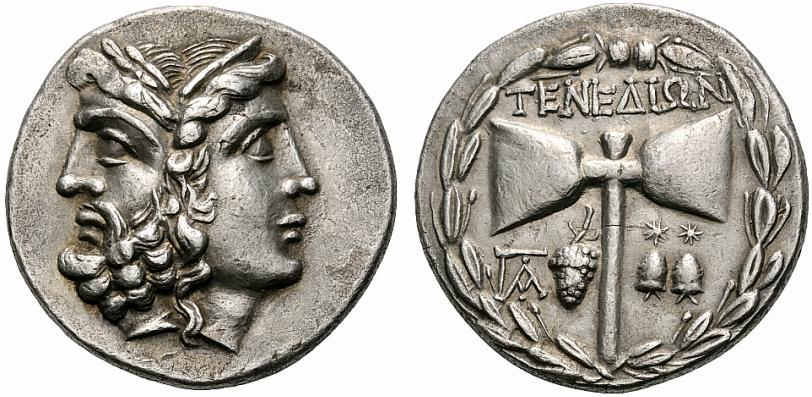
Ancient silver Tetradrachm from Tenedos, depicting Zeus and Hera and bearing the inscription "Τενεδίων" (Tenedion) on the other side

The island is known in English as Tenedos (the Greek name). Over the centuries many other names have been used. Documented ancient Greek names for the island are Leukophrys, Calydna, Phoenice and Lyrnessus (Pliny, HN 5,140). The official Turkish name for the island is Bozcaada; the Turkish word "boz" means either a barren land or grey to brown color (sources indicate both of these meanings may have been associated with the island) and "ada" meaning island. The name Tenedos was derived, according to Apollodorus of Athens, from the Greek hero Tenes, who ruled the island at the time of the Trojan War and was killed by Achilles. Apollodorus writes that the island was originally known as Leocophrys until Tenes landed on the island and became the ruler. The island became known as Bozcaada when the Ottoman Empire took the island over. Tenedos remained a common name for the island along with Bozcaada after the Ottoman conquest of the island, often with Greek populations and Turkish populations using different names for the island.

== Geography and climate ==
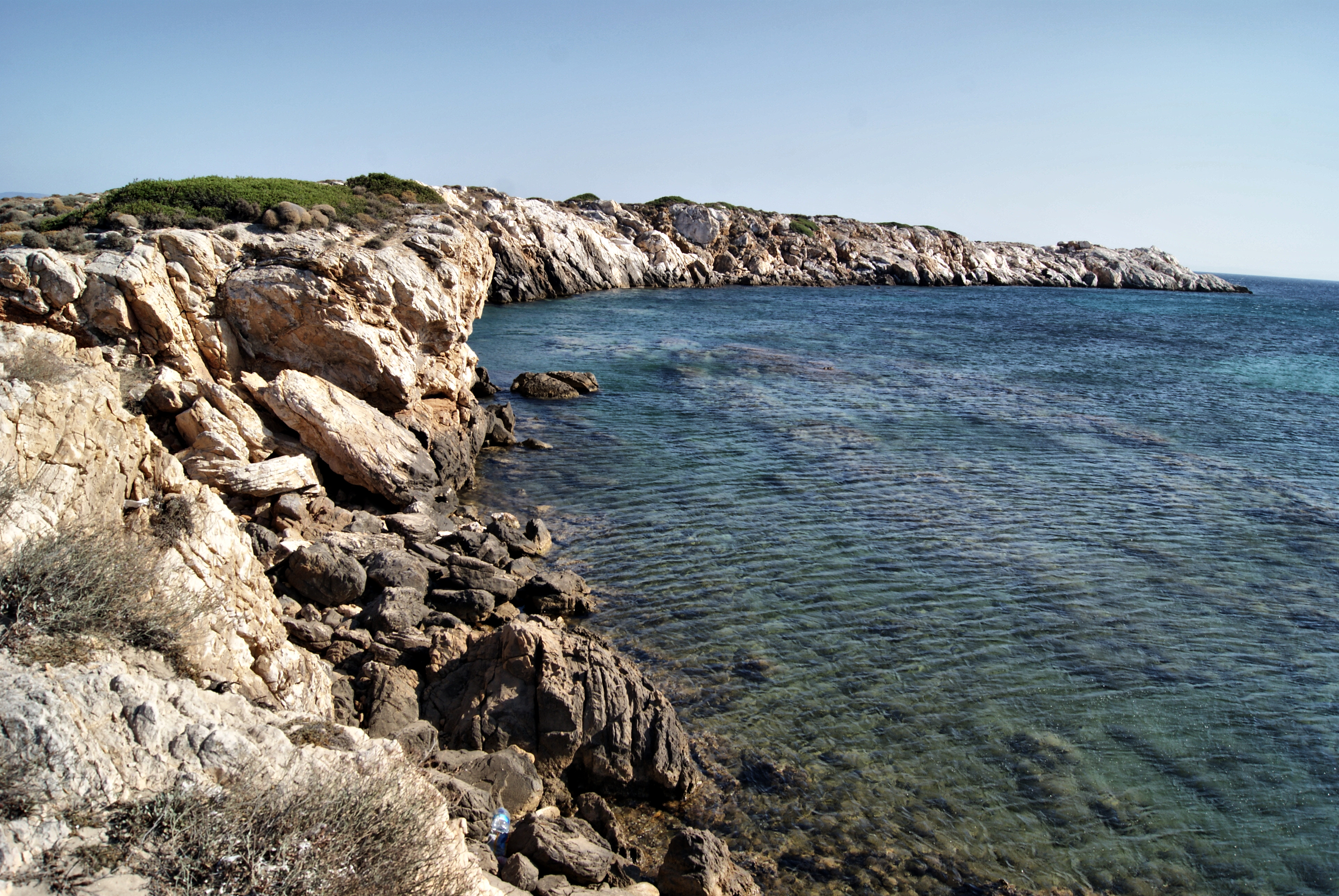
Rocks along the shore in Akvaryum Beach

Tenedos is roughly triangular in shape. Its area is 39.9 km^{2} (15 sq mi). It is the third largest Turkish island after Marmara Island and Imbros (Gökçeada). It is surrounded by small islets, and is situated close to the entrance of the Dardanelles. It is the only rural district (ilçe) of Turkey without any villages, and has only one major settlement, the town center.

Geological evidence suggests that the island broke away from the mainland producing a terrain that is mainly plains in the west with hills in the Northeast, and the highest point is 192 metres (630 ft). The central part of the island is the most amenable to agricultural activities. There is a small pine forest in the Southwestern part of the island. The westernmost part of the island has large sandy areas not suitable for agriculture.

The island has a Mediterranean climate with strong northern winds called etesians. Average temperature is 16 °C (61 °F) and the average annual precipitation is around 500 millimetres (20 in). There are a number of small streams running from north to south at the southwestern part of the island. Freshwater sources though are not enough for the island so water is piped in from the mainland.

Climate data for Tenedos (1991–2020)
Month	Jan	Feb	Mar	Apr	May	Jun	Jul	Aug	Sep	Oct	Nov	Dec	Year
Mean daily maximum °C (°F)	10.9 (51.6)	11.5 (52.7)	13.5 (56.3)	17.1 (62.8)	21.6 (70.9)	25.6 (78.1)	27.1 (80.8)	27.2 (81.0)	24.5 (76.1)	20.3 (68.5)	16.1 (61.0)	12.3 (54.1)	19.0 (66.2)
Daily mean °C (°F)	8.4 (47.1)	8.8 (47.8)	10.6 (51.1)	13.7 (56.7)	17.9 (64.2)	21.8 (71.2)	23.5 (74.3)	23.8 (74.8)	21.2 (70.2)	17.5 (63.5)	13.5 (56.3)	10.0 (50.0)	15.9 (60.6)
Mean daily minimum °C (°F)	6.1 (43.0)	6.4 (43.5)	7.9 (46.2)	10.8 (51.4)	14.8 (58.6)	18.5 (65.3)	20.4 (68.7)	20.9 (69.6)	18.4 (65.1)	15.0 (59.0)	11.2 (52.2)	7.8 (46.0)	13.2 (55.8)
Average precipitation mm (inches)	66.0 (2.60)	64.74 (2.55)	58.89 (2.32)	42.45 (1.67)	20.15 (0.79)	12.86 (0.51)	3.99 (0.16)	6.57 (0.26)	20.61 (0.81)	45.66 (1.80)	63.92 (2.52)	91.36 (3.60)	497.2 (19.57)
Average precipitation days (≥ 1.0 mm)	6.4	7.0	5.7	5.2	3.1	2.0	1.2	1.6	2.9	4.2	6.1	8.4	53.8
Average relative humidity (%)	78.3	76.7	74.8	74.0	73.6	72.3	72.5	73.0	73.3	77.2	78.1	78.7	75.2
Source: NOAA

== History ==
=== Prehistory ===
Archeological findings indicate that the first human settlement on the island dates back to the Early Bronze Age II (ca. 3000–2700 BC). Archaeological evidence suggests the culture on the island had elements in common with the cultures of northwestern Anatolia and the Cycladic Islands. Most settlement was on the small bays on the east side of the island which formed natural harbours. Settlement archaeological work was done quickly and thus did not find definitive evidence of grape cultivation on the island during this period. However, grape cultivation was common on neighboring islands and the nearby mainland during this time.

According to a reconstruction, based on the myth of Tenes, Walter Leaf stated that the first inhabitants of the island could be Pelasgians, who were driven out of the Anatolian mainland by the Phrygians. According to the same author, there are possible traces of Minoan and Mycenaean Greek influence in the island.

=== Antiquity ===
Tenedos next to ancient Troy, with Imbros to the north and Lesbos to the south

Ancient Tenedos is referred to in Greek and Roman mythology, and archaeologists have uncovered evidence of its settlement from the Bronze Age. It would stay prominent through the age of classical Greece, fading by the time of the dominance of ancient Rome. Although a small island, Tenedos's position in the straits and its two harbors made it important to the Mediterranean powers over the centuries. For nine months of the year, the currents and the prevailing wind, the etesian, came, and still come, from the Black Sea hampering sailing vessels headed for Constantinople. They had to wait a week or more at Tenedos, waiting for the favorable southerly wind. Tenedos thus served as a shelter and way station for ships bound for the Hellespont, Propontis, Bosphorus, and places farther on. Several of the regional powers captured or attacked the island, including the Athenians, the Persians, the Macedonians under Alexander the Great, the Seleucids and the Attalids.

Zoilus wrote a now-lost work entitled Eulogy of the Tenedians.

Callisteia (καλλιστεῖα) were beauty contests celebrated across ancient Greece, with the island of Tenedos being one of the known sites where such competitions were held.

=== Mythology ===
Homer mentions Apollo as the chief deity of Tenedos in his time. According to him, the island was captured by Achilles during the siege of Troy. Nestor obtained his slave Hecamede there during one of Achilles's raids. Nestor also sailed back from Troy stopping at Tenedos and island-hopping to Lesbos. The Odyssey mentions the Greeks leaving Troy after winning the war first traveled to nearby Tenedos, sacrificed there, and then went to Lesbos before pausing to choose between alternative routes.

Homer, in the Iliad mention that between Tenedos and Imbros there was a wide cavern, in which Poseidon stayed his horses.

Virgil, in the Aeneid, described the Achaeans hiding their fleet at the bay of Tenedos, toward the end of the Trojan War, to trick Troy into believing the war was over and allowing them to take the Trojan Horse within Troy's city walls. In Aeneid, it is also the island from which twin serpents came to kill the Trojan priest Laocoön and his sons as punishment for throwing a spear at the Trojan Horse. According to Pindar (Nemean Odes no. 11), the island was founded after the war by bronze-clad warriors from Amyklai, traveling with Orestes.

According to myth, Tenes was the son of Cycnus, himself the son of Poseidon and Calyce. Philonome, Cycnus's second wife and hence Tenes's stepmother, tried to seduce Tenes and was rejected. She then accused him of rape leading to his abandonment at sea along with his sister. They washed up on the island of Leucophrys where he was proclaimed king and the island renamed Tenedos in his honor. When Cycnus realized the lie behind the allegations he took a ship to apologize to his son. The myths differ on whether they reconciled. According to one version, when the father landed on the island of Tenedos, Tenes cut the cord holding his boat. The phrase 'hatchet of Tenes' came to mean resentment that could not be soothed. Another myth had Achilles landing on Tenedos, while sailing from Aulis to Troy. There his navy stormed the island, and Achilles fought Tenes, in this myth a son of Apollo, and killed him, not knowing Tenes's lineage and hence unaware of the danger of Apollo's revenge. Achilles would also later kill Tenes's father, Cycnus, at Troy. In Sophocles's Philoctetes, written in 409 BC, a serpent bit Philoctetes in the foot at Tenedos. According to Hyginus, the goddess Hera, upset with Philoctetes for helping Hercules, had sent the snake to punish him. His wound refused to heal, and the Greeks abandoned him, before going back to him for help later during the attack on Troy. Athenaeus quoted Nymphodorus's remarks on the beauty of the women of Tenedos.

Plutarch writes that the people of Tenedos prohibited both aulos-players from entering the sanctuary of Tenes and the mention of Achilles name within it because of events associated with Tenes. According to the tradition, an aulos-player named Molpus falsely testified that Tenes had attempted to seduce his stepmother, forcing Tenes to flee to Tenedos with his sister. Later, although Thetis had warned Achilles not to kill Tenes because he was especially honoured by Apollo, and had instructed one of his servants to remind him of this, Achilles unknowingly slew Tenes while he was defending his sister. Realizing his mistake only after Tenes had fallen, Achilles killed the servant who had failed to remind him of the warning and buried Tenes on the site where his sanctuary was later established. Diodorus Siculus preserves a similar tradition, likewise explaining that aulos-players were excluded from Tenes sacred precinct because one had borne false witness against him, and that Achilles name was forbidden because he had slain Tenes. Unlike Plutarch, however, Diodorus relates that Tenes reached the island after his father cast him into the sea in a chest, having believed his wife's false accusations, and he omits Plutarch's account of Thetis warning to Achilles and the servant who failed to remind him.

Callimachus talked of a myth in which Ino's son Melikertes washed up dead in Tenedos after being thrown into the sea by his mother, who killed herself too; the residents, Lelegians, built an altar for Melikertes and started a ritual of a woman sacrificing her infant child when the town's need was dire. The woman would then be blinded. The myths also added that the custom was abolished when Orestes' descendants settled the place.

Neoptolemus stayed two days at Tenedos, following the advice of Thetis, before he go to the land of the Molossians together with Helenus.

=== Archaic period ===
It was at Tenedos, along with Lesbos, that the first coins with Greek writing on them were minted. Figures of bunches of grapes and wine vessels such as amphorae and kantharoi were stamped on coins. The very first coins had a twin head of a male and a female on the obverse side. The early coins were of silver and had a double-headed axe imprinted on them. Aristotle considered the axe as symbolizing the decapitation of those convicted of adultery, a Tenedian decree. The axe-head was either a religious symbol or the seal of a trade unit of currency. Apollo Smintheus, a god who both protected against and brought about plague, was worshipped in late Bronze Age Tenedos. Strabo's Geography writes that Tenedos "contains an Aeolian city and has two harbours, and a temple of Apollo Smintheus" (Strabo's Geography, Vol. 13). The relationship between Tenedos and Apollo is mentioned in Book I of the Iliad where a priest calls to Apollo with the name "O god of the silver bow, that protectest Chryse and holy Cilla and rulest Tenedos with thy might"(Iliad I).

During the later part of the Bronze Age and during the Iron Age, the place served as a major point between the Mediterranean and the Black Sea. Homer's Iliad mentions the Tenedos of this era. The culture and artisanship of the area, as represented by pottery and metal vessels recovered from graves, matched that of the northeastern Aegean. Archaeologists have found no evidence to substantiate Herodotus's assertion Aeolians had settled in Tenedos by the Bronze Age. Homer mentions Tenedos as a base for the Achaean fleet during the Trojan war.

The Iron Age settlement of the northeast Aegean was once attributed to Aeolians, descendants of Orestes and hence of the House of Atreus in Mycenae, from across the Aegean from Thessaly, Boiotia and Akhaia, all in mainland Greece. Pindar, in his 11th Nemean Ode, hints at a group of Peloponnesians, the children of the fighters at Troy, occupying Tenedos, with Orestes, the son of Agamemnon, landing straight on the island; specifically he refers to a Spartan Peisandros and his descendant Aristagoras, with Peisandaros having come over with Orestes. Strabo places the start of the migration sixty years after the Trojan war, initiated by Orestes's son, Penthilos, with the colonization continuing onto Penthilos's grandson.

The archaeological record provides no supporting evidence for the theory of Aiolian occupation. During the pre-archaic period, adults in Lesbos were buried by placing them in large jars, and later clay coverings were used, similar to Western Asia Minor. Still later, Tenedians began to both bury and cremate their adults in pits buttressed with stone along the walls. Children were still buried covered in jars. Some items buried with the person, such as pottery, gifts and safety-pin-like clasps, resemble what is found in Anatolia, in both style and drawings and pictures, more than they resemble burial items in mainland Greece.

While human, specifically infant, sacrifice has been mentioned in connection with Tenedos's ancient past, it is now considered mythical in nature. The hero Paleomon in Tenedos was worshipped by a cult in that island, and the sacrifices were attributed to the cult. At Tenedos, people did sacrifice a newborn calf dressed in buskins, after treating the cow like a pregnant women giving birth; the person who killed the calf was then stoned and driven out into a life on the sea. According to Harold Willoughby, a belief in the calf as a ritual incarnation of God drove this practice.

=== Classical period ===
From the Archaic to Classical period, the archaeological evidence of well-stocked graves establishes Tenedos's continuing affluence. Tall, broad-mouthed containers show grapes and olives were likely processed during this time. They were also used to bury dead infants. By the fourth century BC, grapes and wine had become relevant to the economy of the island. Tenedians likely exported surplus wine. Writings from this era talk of a shortage of agricultural land, indicating a booming settlement. A dispute with the neighboring island of Sigeum was arbitrated by Periander of Corinth, who handed over political control of a swath of the mainland to Tenedos. In the first century BC this territory was eventually incorporated into Alexandria Troas.

According to some accounts, Thales of Greece died in Tenedos. Cleostratus, an astronomer, lived and worked in Tenedos, though it is unknown whether he met Thales there. Cleostratus is one of the founders of Greek astronomy, influenced as it was by the reception of Babylonian knowledge. Athens had a naval base on the island in the fifth and fourth century BC. Demosthenes mentions Apollodorus, a trierarch commanding a ship, talking of buying food during a stopover at Tenedos where he would pass the trierarchy to Polycles. In 493 BCE, the Persians overran Tenedos along with other Greek islands. During his reign, Philip II of Macedon, father of Alexander the Great, sent a Macedonian force sailing against the Persian fleet. Along with other Aegean islands such as Lesbos, Tenedos also rebelled against the Persian dominance at this time. Athens seemingly augmented its naval base with a fleet at the island around 450 BC.

During the campaign of Alexander the Great against the Persians, Pharnabazus, the Persian commander, laid siege to Tenedos with a hundred ships and eventually captured it as Alexander could not send a fleet in time to save the island. The island's walls were demolished and the islanders had to accept the old treaty with the Persian emperor Artaxerxes II: the Peace of Antalcidas. Later, Alexander's commander Hegelochus of Macedon captured the island from the Persians. Alexander made an alliance with the people in Tenedos in order to limit the Persian naval power. He also took on board 3000 Greek mercenaries and oarsmen from Tenedos in his army and navy.

The land was not suitable for large-scale grazing or extensive agriculture. Local grapes and wines were mentioned in inscriptions and on coins. But Pliny and other contemporary writers did not mention grapes and wines at the island. Most exports were via sea, and both necessities and luxuries had to imported, again by sea. Unlike in Athens, it is unclear whether Tenedos ever had a democracy. Marjoram (Oregano) from Tenedos was one of the relishes used in Greek cuisine. The Tenedians punished adulterers by cutting off their heads with an axe. Aristotle wrote about the social and political structure of Tenedos. He found it notable a large part of the populace worked in occupations related to ferries, possibly hundreds in a population of thousands. Pausanias noted some common proverbs in Greek originated from customs of the Tenedians. "He is a man of Tenedos" was used to allude to a person of unquestionable integrity, and "to cut with the Tenedian axe" was a full and final 'no'. Lykophron, writing in the second century BC, referred to the deity Melikertes as the "baby-slayer". Xenophon described the Spartans' sacking the place in 389 BC, but being beaten back by an Athenian fleet when trying again two years later.

The Periplus of Pseudo-Scylax states that the astronomer Kleostratos (Ancient Greek: Κλεόστρατος) was from Tenedos.

=== Hellenistic period ===
In the Hellenistic period, the Egyptian goddess Isis was also worshipped at Tenedos. There she was associated closely with the sun, with her name and title reflecting that position.

Strabo states that Achaeium marked the beginning of the part of the mainland belonging to Tenedos.

=== Roman period ===
During the Roman occupation of Greece, Tenedos too came under their rule. The island became a part of the Roman Republic in 133 BC, when Attalus III, the king of Pergamon, died, leaving his territory to the Romans. The Romans constructed a new port at Alexandria Troas, on the Dardanelle Strait. This led to Tenedos's decline. Tenedos lost its importance during this period. Virgil, in Aeneid, stated the harbour was deserted and ships could not moor in the bay during his time. Processing of grapes seems to have been abandoned. Olive cultivation and processing did possibly continue, though there was likely no surplus to export. Archaeological evidence indicates the settlement was mostly in the town, with only a few scattered sites in the countryside.

According to Strabo there was a kinship between the peoples of Tenedos and Tenea (a town at Corinth).

According to Cicero a number of deified human beings were worshipped in Greece: in Tenedos there was Tenes.

Pausanias, mention at his work Description of Greece that Periklyto, who was from Tenedos, has dedicated some axes at Delphoi.

During the Third Mithridatic War, in around 73 BC, Tenedos was the site of a large naval battle between Roman commander Lucullus and the fleet of the king of Pontus, Mithridates, commanded by Neoptolemus. This Battle of Tenedos was won decisively by the Romans. Around 81–75 BC, Verres, legate of the Governor of Cilicia, Gaius Dolabella, plundered the island, carrying off the statue of Tenes and some money. Towards 6 BC, geographical change made the mainland port less useful, and Tenedos became relevant again. According to Dio Chrysostom and Plutarch, Tenedos was famous for its pottery ca AD 100. Under Rome's protection, Tenedos restarted its mint after a break of more than a century. The mint continued with the old designs, improving on detail and precision. Cicero, writing in this era, noted the temple built to honor Tenes, the founder whose name the island received, and of the harsh justice system of the populace.

=== Byzantine period ===
When Constantinople became a prominent city in the Roman Empire, from AD 350 on, Tenedos became a crucial trading post. Emperor Justinian I ordered the construction of a large granary on Tenedos and ferries between the island and Constantinople became a major activity on the island. Ships carrying grain from Egypt to Constantinople stopped at Tenedos when the sea was unfavorable. The countryside was likely not heavily populated or utilized. There were vineyards, orchards and corn fields, at times abandoned due to disputes.

The Eastern Orthodox Church placed the diocese of Tenedos under the metropolitanate of Mytilini during the ninth century, and promoted it to its own metropolitanate in early fourteenth century. By this time Tenedos was part of the Byzantine Empire but its location made it a key target of the Venetians, the Genoese, and the Ottoman Empire. The weakened Byzantine Empire and wars between Genoa and Venice for trade routes made Tenedos a key strategic location. In 1304, Andrea Morisco, a Genoese adventurer, backed by a title from the Byzantine emperor Andronikos III, took over Tenedos. Later, sensing political tension in the Byzantine empire just before the Second Byzantine Civil War, the Venetians offered 20,000 ducats in 1350 to John V Palaiologos for control of Tenedos. When John V was captured in the Byzantine civil war, he was deported to Tenedos by John VI Kantakouzenos.

John V eventually claimed victory in the civil war, but the cost was significant debt, mainly to the Venetians. In the summer of 1369, John V sailed to Venice and apparently offered the island of Tenedos in exchange for twenty-five thousand ducats and his own crown jewels. However, his son (Andronikos IV Palaiologos), acting as the regent in Constantinople, rejected the deal possibly because of Genoese pressure. Andronikos tried but failed to depose his father. In 1376, John V sold the island to Venice on the same terms as before. This upset the Genoese of Galata. The Genoese helped the imprisoned Andronikos to escape and depose his father. Andronikos repaid the favor ceding them Tenedos. But the garrison on the island refused the agreement and gave control over to the Venetians.

The Venetians established an outpost on the island, a move that caused significant tension with the Byzantine Empire (then represented by Andronikos IV)and the Genoese. In the Treaty of Turin, which ended the War of Chioggia between Venice and Genoa, the Venetians were to hand over control of the island to Amadeo of Savoy and the Genoese were to pay the bill for the removal of all fortifications on the island. The Treaty of Turin specified that the Venetians would destroy all the island's "castles, walls, defences, houses and habitations from top to bottom 'in such fashion that the place can never be rebuilt or reinhabited". The Greek populace was not a party to the negotiations, but were to be paid for being uprooted. The baillie of Tenedos, Zanachi Mudazzo, refused to evacuate the place, and the Doge of Venice, Antonio Venier, protested the expulsion. The senators of Venice reaffirmed the treaty, the proposed solution of handing the island back to the Emperor seen as unacceptable to the Genoese. Toward the end of 1383, the population of almost 4000 was shipped out to Euboea and Crete. Buildings on the island were then razed leaving it empty. Venetians continued to use the harbor.

The Venetians were zealous guarding the right to Tenedos the Treaty of Turin provided them. The Grand Master of the Knights of Rhodes wanted to build a fortification at the island in 1405, with the knights bearing the cost, but the Venetians refused to allow this. The island remained largely uninhabited for the next decades. When Ruy Gonzáles de Clavijo visited the island in 1403 he remarked that because of the Treaty of Turin "Tenedos has since come to be uninhabited." 29 May 1416 saw the first battle at sea between the Venetians and the emerging Ottoman fleet at Gallipoli. The Venetian captain-general, Pietro Loredan, won, wiped out the Turks on board, and retired down the coast to Tenedos, where he killed all the non-Turk prisoners who had voluntarily joined the Turks. In the treaty of 1419 between Sultan Mehmed and the Venetians, Tenedos was the dividing line beyond which the Turkish fleet was not to advance. Spanish adventurer Pedro Tafur visited the island in 1437 and found it deserted, with many rabbits, the vineyards covering the island in disrepair, but the port well-maintained. He mentioned frequent Turkish attacks on shipping in the harbor. In 1453, the port was used by the commander of a single-ship Venetian fleet, Giacomo Loredan, as a monitoring point to observe the Turkish fleet, on his way to Constantinople in what would become the final defense of that city against the Turks.

=== Ottoman period ===
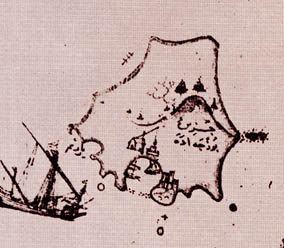
Map of Tenedos (Bozcaada) by the Ottoman cartographer Piri Reis (16th century)

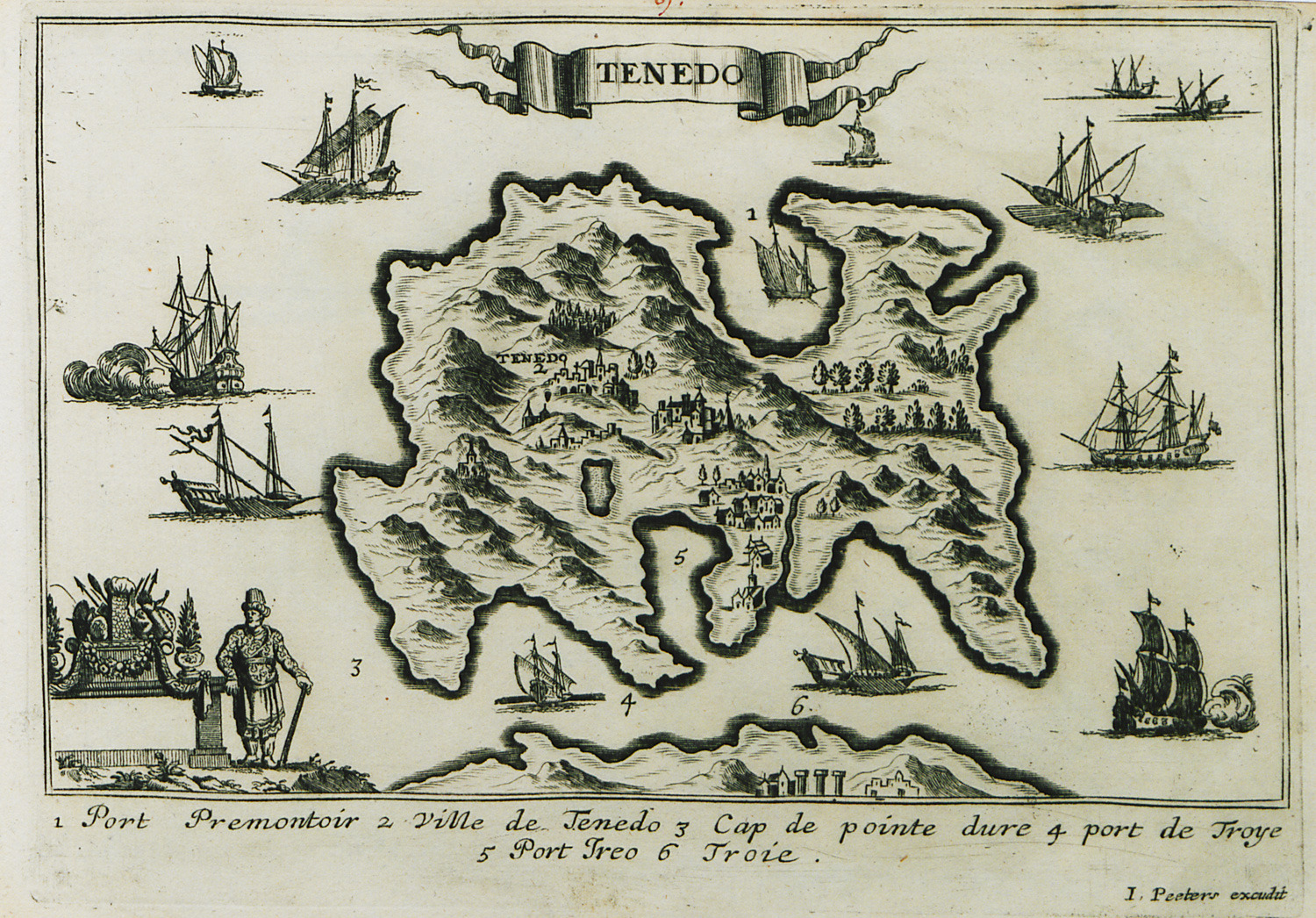
Map of Tenedo by Flemish painter Jacob Peeters (1690)

Tenedos was occupied by Sultan Mehmet II in 1455, two years after his Conquest of Constantinople ending the Byzantine empire. It became the first island controlled by the Ottoman Empire in the Aegean sea. The island was still uninhabited at that time, almost 75 years after it had been forcefully evacuated. Mehmet II rebuilt the island's fort. During his reign the Ottoman navy used the island as a supply base. The Venetians, realizing the strategic importance of the island, deployed forces on it. Giacopo Loredano took Tenedos for Venice in 1464. The same year, Ottoman Admiral Mahmud Pasha recaptured the island. During the Ottoman regime, the island was repopulated (by granting a tax exemption). The Ottoman fleet admiral and cartographer, Piri Reis, in his book Kitab-ı Bahriye, completed in 1521, included a map of the shore and the islands off it, marking Tenedos as well. He noted that ships heading north from Smyrna to the Dardanelles passed usually through the seven-mile strip of sea between the island and the mainland.

Tommaso Morosini of Venice set out with 23 ships from Crete on 20 March 1646, heading to Istanbul. They stopped at Tenedos, but failed to establish a foothold there when their ship caught fire, killing many of the crew. In 1654, Hozam Ali of the Turkish fleet landed at the island, gathering Turkish forces for a naval battle against the Venetians. This, the Battle of the Dardanelles (1654), the first of four in a series, the Ottomans won. After the Battle of the Dardanelles in 1656, Barbaro Badoer of the Venetians seized the island on 8 July. The Ottoman defeat weakened its Sultan Mehmed IV, then aged 16, and strengthened the Grand Vizier, Köprülü Mehmed Pasha.

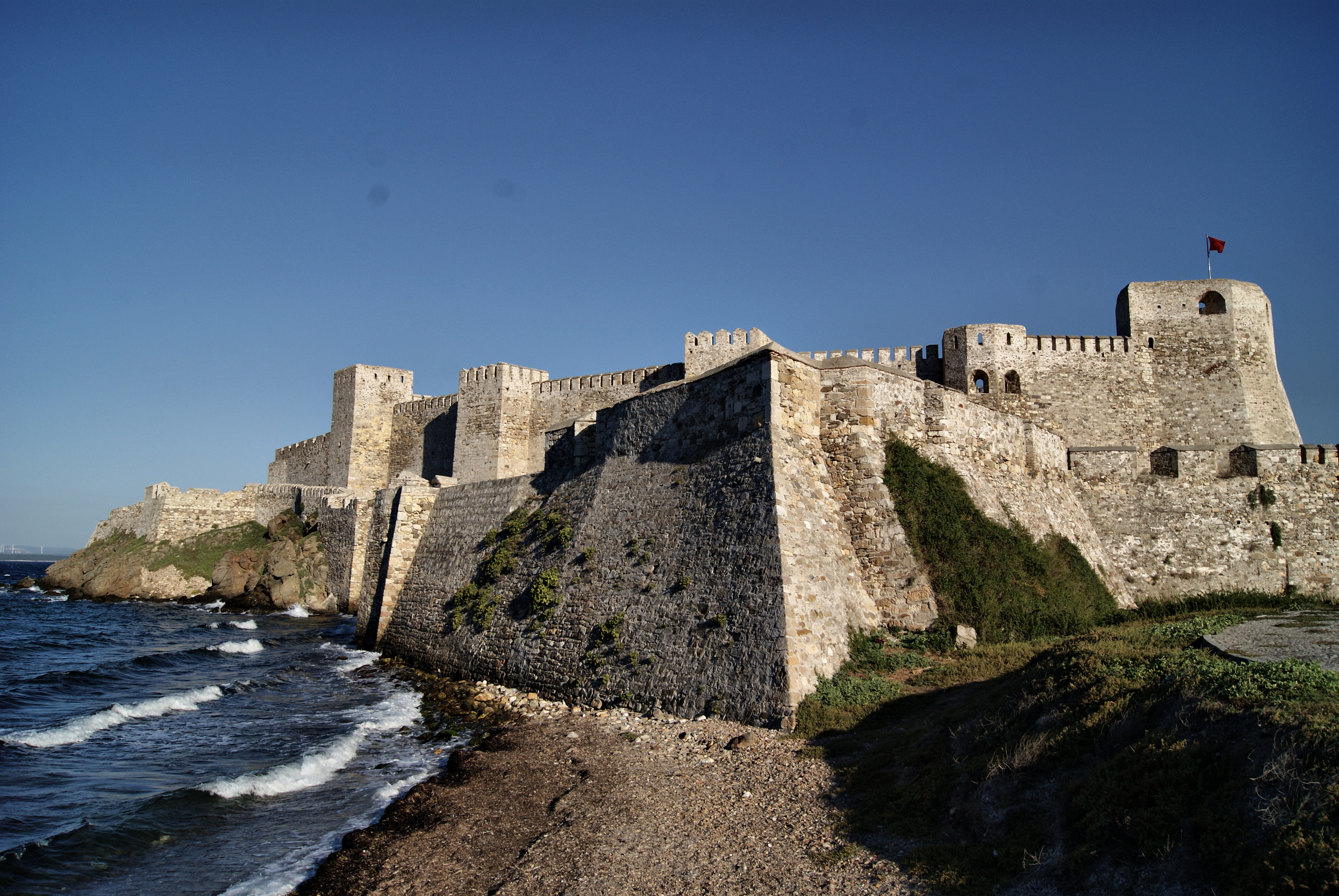
Bozcaada Castle

In March 1657, an Ottoman Armada emerged through the Dardanelles, slipping through a Venetian blockade, with the objective of retaking the island but did not attempt to do so, concerned by the Venetian fleet. In July 1657, Köprülü made a decision to break the Venetian blockade and retake the territory. The Peace Party in the Venetian senate thought it best to not defend Tenedos, and Lemnos, and debated this with the War Party. Köprülü ended the argument by recapturing Tenedos on 31 August 1657, in the Battle of the Dardanelles (1657), the fourth and final one.

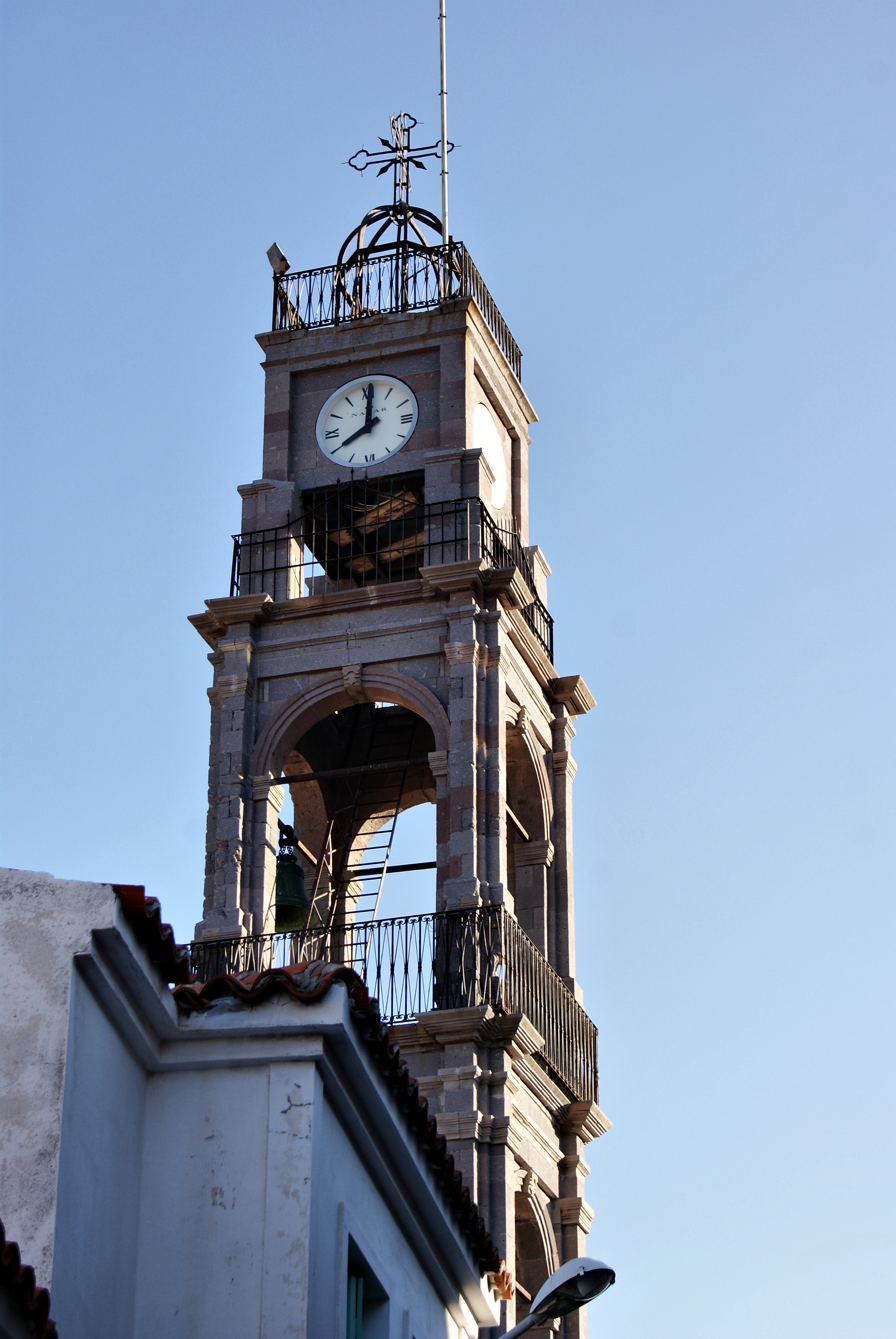
Close up of Bozcaada Clock Tower

Following the victory, the Grand Vizier visited the island and oversaw its repairs, during which he funded construction of a mosque, which was to be called by his name. According to the Mosque's Foundation's book, it was built on the site of an older mosque, called Mıhçı Mosque which was destroyed during Venetian occupation. By the time Köprülü died in September 1661, he had built on the island the businesses of a coffee-house, a bakery, 84 shops, and nine mills; a watermill; two mosques; a school; a rest stop for travelers and a stable; and a bath-house.

Rabbits which drew the attention of Tafur two-and-a-half centuries ago were apparently still abundant in the mid 17th century. In 1659 the traveler Evliya Çelebi was sent to the island with the task of collecting game for the Sultan Mehmed IV. The disorder of the 1600s hampered supply lines and caused grain shortages in Bozcaada.

As a result of the series of setbacks Ottomans faced in Rumelia during the later years of the reign of Mehmed IV, with the Grand Vizier being Sarı Süleyman Pasha, the forces at the island are reported to have mutinied in 1687 with parts of the rest of the army. These widespread mutinies would result in the deposing of the Sultan and the Grand Vizier that year.

In 1691 the Venetians and allies formed a war council to discuss retaking the island. The council met regularly at the galley of Domenico Mocenigo, the captain-general of the Venetian fleet. By this time, the only people on the island were those in the fort. Mocenigo estimated their number to be around 300, and the fort to be weakly buttressed. On 17 July 1691 the war council met off the waters of the island and decided to retake Tenedos since it was, per their estimate, weakly defended but famous. As a first step they decided to gather information. At their next meeting, six days later, they learned from captured slaves that the Turkish garrison, numbering around 3000, had drug trenches and strengthened their defenses. The plan to retake the island was abandoned. Venetians would try to capture Tenedos unsuccessfully in 1697.

The Peace of Karlowitz, which for the first time brought the Ottomans into the mainstream of European diplomacy, was signed on 26 January 1699 by the Ottomans, the Venetians, and a large number of Europeans powers. The Venetian senate sent its ambassador, Soranzo to Istanbul via Tenedos. At the island he was greeted with a royal reception of cannon fire and by the Pasha of the island himself.

During the classical Ottoman period, the island was a kadiluk. The Ottomans built mosques, fountains, hammams, and a medrese. The Ottomans adopted the Byzantine practice of using islands as places for the internal exile of state prisoners, such as Constantine Mourousis and Halil Hamid Pasha. In October 1633, Cyril Contari, Metropolitan of Aleppo in the Orthodox Church, was made the patriarch after promising to pay the Ottoman central authority 50,000 dollars. His inability to pay led to his being exiled to the island for a short time.

Richard Pococke, who visited the island in the 1700s, noted that it had only one town, located on its northeast corner, inhabited by about two hundred Greek families and three hundred Turkish families. The Greeks had a church and three small convents and were subject to the Bishop of Mytilene. The town had two ports, with a large castle standing on a rocky cape between them. A temple to Sminthean Apollo likely once occupied the esplanade in front of the castle; some fluted marble pillars, about two and a half feet in diameter, still remained. The land around the town was rocky and largely uncultivated, as the Turks did not permit the Greeks to farm that quarter, though a small area to the north was productive. The island belonged to the Kapudan Pasha and maintained primarily the Janissary garrison of the castle. Its main exports were good wine and brandy.

In 1807, a joint fleet of the Russians and British captured the island during the Russo-Turkish Wars, with the Russians using it as their military base to achieve the victories at the Dardanelles and Athos; but they ceded control as part of the Treaty of Armistice with the Ottoman Porte. However, the Russian occupations proved to be destructive for the island. The town was burnt down, the harbor was almost filled in and almost all buildings were destroyed. The islanders fled and Tenedos became deserted once more.

In 1822, during the Greek War of Independence, the revolutionaries under Konstantinos Kanaris managed to attack an Ottoman fleet and burn one of its ships off Tenedos. This event was a major morale booster for the Greek Revolution and attracted the attention of the European Powers. The trees that covered the island were destroyed during the war.

During the 19th century, the wine production remained a profitable business while the island's annual wheat production was only enough for three months of the islanders' consumption. Apart from wine, the only export item of the island was a small quantity of wool. Also in the 19th century there had been attempts to introduce pear, fig and mulberry trees. However, there are reports of fruit, especially fig trees being present on the island prior to those attempts.

The 1852 law of the Tanzimat reorganized Turkish islands and Tenedos ended up in the sanjak of Bosje Adassi (Bozcaada), in the Vilayet Jazaǐri. In July 1874, a fire destroyed the place. In 1876, a middle school was added to those on the island, with 22 students and teaching Turkish, Arabic and Persian. By 1878, the island had 2015 males, of whom almost a quarter were Muslim, in around 800 houses. The place also hosted a company of the Ottoman foot-artillery division, along with an Austrian and French vice-consulate. The island was in the sanjak of Bigha, which seated a General Governor. Around 500 casks of gunpowder, left behind by the Russians in a military storehouse, were still there. The fort accommodated the Turkish military camp, a grain silo and two wells.

In 1854, there were some 4,000 inhabitants on the island of Tenedos, of which one-third were Turks. Also, there was only one Greek school on the island with about 200 students.

According to the Ottoman general census of 1893, the population of the island was divided as follows: 2,479 Greeks, 1,247 Turks, 103 Foreign Nationals and 6 Armenians.

By the early 20th century, the island, still under the Turks, had around 2000 people living in wooden houses with gardens. The port provided shelter for ships from the violent northerly winds. The British had a vice consul at the island. The town served as a telegraph station, with an Austrian ship coming in every two weeks. In 1906 the town imports were at 17, 950 liras and exports, mainly wine and raisins, worth 6,250 liras. There were telegraph cables laid in the sea near the port.

=== Between Turkey and Greece ===
==== 1912–1921 ====
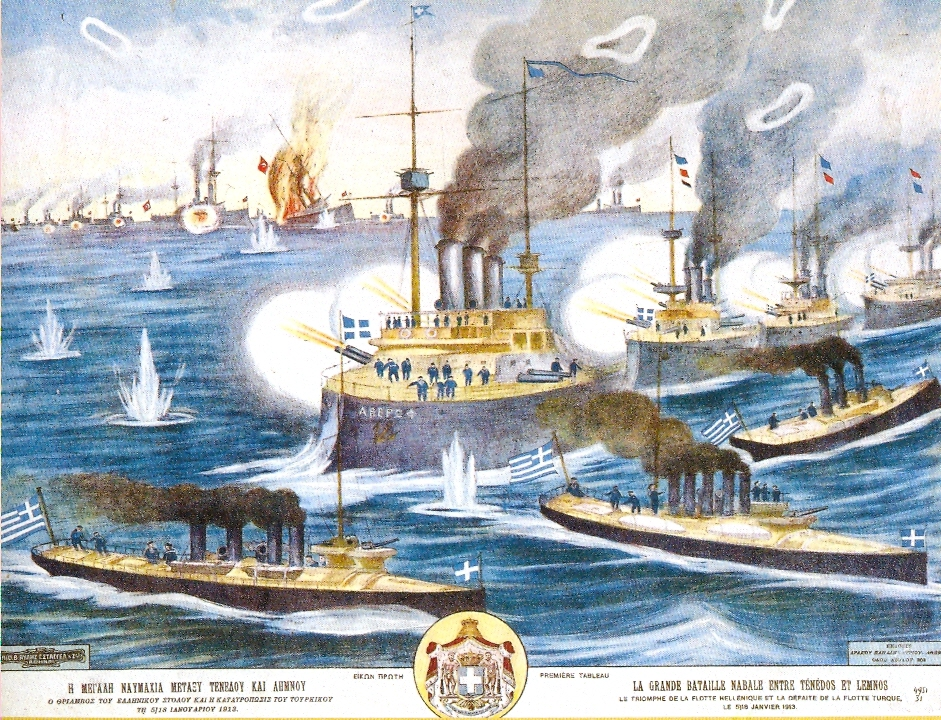
Naval battle between Greek and Ottoman fleets near Tenedos

During the First Balkan War, on 20 October 1912, Tenedos was the first island of the north Aegean that came under the control of the Greek Navy. The Turks that constituted part of Tenedos' population did not welcome the Greek control. By taking over the islands in the Northern Aegean sea, the Greek Navy limited the ability of the Ottoman fleet to move through the Dardanelles. Greek administration of the island lasted until 12 November 1922.

Negotiations to end the Balkan war started in December 1912 in London and the issue of the Aegean islands was one persistent problem. The issue divided the great powers with Germany, Austria-Hungary, and Italy supporting the Ottoman position for return of all the Aegean islands and Britain and France supporting the Greek position for Greek control of all the Aegean islands. With Italy controlling key islands in the region, major power negotiations deadlocked in London and later in Bucharest. Romania threatened military action with the Greeks against the Ottomans in order to force negotiations in Athens in November 1913. Eventually, Greece and the United Kingdom pressured the Germans to support an agreement where the Ottomans would retain Tenedos, Kastelorizo and Imbros and the Greeks would control the other Aegean islands. The Greeks accepted the plan while the Ottoman Empire rejected the ceding of the other Aegean islands. This agreement would not hold, but the outbreak of World War I and the Turkish War of Independence put the issue to the side.

During the World War I Gallipoli Campaign, the British used the island as a supply base and built a 600 m-long (2,000 ft) airstrip for military operations.

After the Turkish War of Independence ended in Greek defeat in Anatolia, and the fall of Lloyd George and his Middle Eastern policies, the western powers agreed to the Treaty of Lausanne with the new Turkish Republic, in 1923. This treaty made Tenedos and Imbros part of Turkey, and it guaranteed a special autonomous administrative status there to accommodate the local Greek population. The treaty excluded the Orthodox Christians on the islands from the population exchange that took place between Greece and Turkey. Article 14 of the treaty provided specific guarantees safeguarding the rights of minorities in both the nations.

In 1912, when the Ecumenical Patriarchate of Constantinople conducted its own census, the population of the island was estimated to be: 5,420 Greeks and 1,200 Turks.

==== 1922 and later ====
Greece returned the island to Turkey in 1922. The inhabitants, substantially Greek Orthodox, were exempt from compulsory expulsion per the Lausanne Treaty's article 14, paragraph 2. Despite the treaty, the state of international relations between Greece and Turkey, wider world issues, and domestic pressures influenced how the Greek minority of Tenedos was treated. Acting reciprocally with Greece, Turkey made systematic attempts to evacuate the Greeks on the isle. Turkey never implemented either the Article 14 guarantee of some independence for the place in local rules, or the Article 39 guarantee to Turkish citizens, of all ethnicities, of the freedom to choose the language they wanted to use in their daily lives.

In early 1926, conscripts and reservists of the army from Tenedos were transported to Anatolia. Great panic was engendered, and Greek youths fearing oppression fled the island. Others, who tried to hide in the mountains, were soon discovered and moved to Anatolia.

Turkish law 1151 in 1927 specifically put administration of the islands in the hands of the Turkish government and not local populations, outlawed schooling in the Greek language and closed the Greek schools. According to the official Turkish census, in 1927 there were 2,500 Greeks and 1,247 Turks on the island.

The Greco-Turkish rapprochement of 1930, which marks a significant turning point in the relations of the two countries, helped Tenedos reap some benefits too. In September 1933, moreover, certain islanders who had emigrated to America were allowed to return to and settle in their native land. Responding to the Greek good will over the straits, Turkey permitted the regular election of a local Greek mayor and seven village elders as well as a number of local employees.

In the 1950s, tension between Greece and Turkey eased and law 1151/1927 was abolished and replaced by law no. 5713 in 1951, according to the law regular Greek language classes were added to the curriculum of the schools on Tenedos. Also, as restriction of travel to the island was relaxed, a growing number of Greek tourists from Istanbul and abroad visited Tenedos. These tourists did not only bring much needed additional revenues, but they also put an end to the twenty-seven-year long isolation of the islands from the outside world.

However, when tensions increased in 1963 over Cyprus, the Turkish government again invoked a ban against Greek language education, and appropriated community property held by Greeks on the island. In 1964 Turkey closed the Greek-speaking schools on the island again. Furthermore, with the 1964 Law On Land Expropriation (No 6830) the farm property of the Greeks on the island was taken away from their owners. These policies, better economic options elsewhere, presence of a larger Greek community in Greece, fear and pressure, resulted in an exodus of the Greek population from the isle. The migrants retain Turkish citizenship but their descendants are not entitled to it. Greeks who left the island in the 1960s, often sold their properties, at particularly low prices, to their Turkish neighbours, which reflected the situation of duress under which they had to leave.

In 1992, the Human Rights Watch report concluded that the Turkish government has denied the rights of the Greek community on Imbros and Tenedos in violation of the Lausanne Treaty and international human rights laws and agreements.

In recent years there has been some progress in the relations between the different religious groups on the islands. In 2005, a joint Greek and Turkish delegation visited Tenedos and later that year Turkish Prime Minister Recep Tayyip Erdoğan visited the island. After that visit, the Turkish government funded the restoration of the bell tower of the Orthodox Church in Tenedos (built originally in 1869). In 1925 the Orthodox church became part of the Metropolis of Imbros and Tenedos. Cyril Dragounis has been its bishop since 2002. In 2009, the Foundation of the Bozcaada Koimisis Theotokou Greek Orthodox Church won a judgement in the European Court of Human Rights for recognition and financial compensation over their degraded cemetery.

=== Turkish rule ===
Turkey continued the old practice of exiling people to the island. The Democratic Party exiled Kemal Pilavoğlu, the leader of a religious sect, Ticani, to Tenedos for life, for sacrilege against Atatürk. Foreigners were prohibited from visiting the islands until the 1990s. However, in the mid-1990s, the Turkish government financially supported the expansion of wineries and tourist opportunities on the island. Today the island is a growing summer tourist location for wine enthusiasts and others.

Since 2011 an annual half marathon has been run on the island.

=== Proverbs of ancient Greeks regarding the island ===
Greeks used the proverb "Tenedian human" (Ancient Greek: Τενέδιος ἄνθρωπος) in reference to those with frightening appearance, because when Tenes laid down laws at the island he stipulated that a man with an axe should stand behind the judge and strike the man being convicted after he had spoken in vain. In addition, they used the proverb "Tenedian advocate" (Ancient Greek: Τενέδιος συνήγορος), meaning a harsh advocate. There are many explanations regarding this proverb. Some say because the Tenedians honor two axes in their dedications. Aristotle said because a Tenedian king used to try lawsuits with an axe, so that he could execute wrongdoers on the spot, or because there was a place in Tenedos called Asserina, where there was a small river in which crabs have shell which was like an axe, or because a certain king laid down a law that adulterers should both be beheaded, and he observed this in the case of his son. Others said because of what Tenes suffered at the hands of his stepmother, he used to judge homicide suits with an axe.

== Population ==
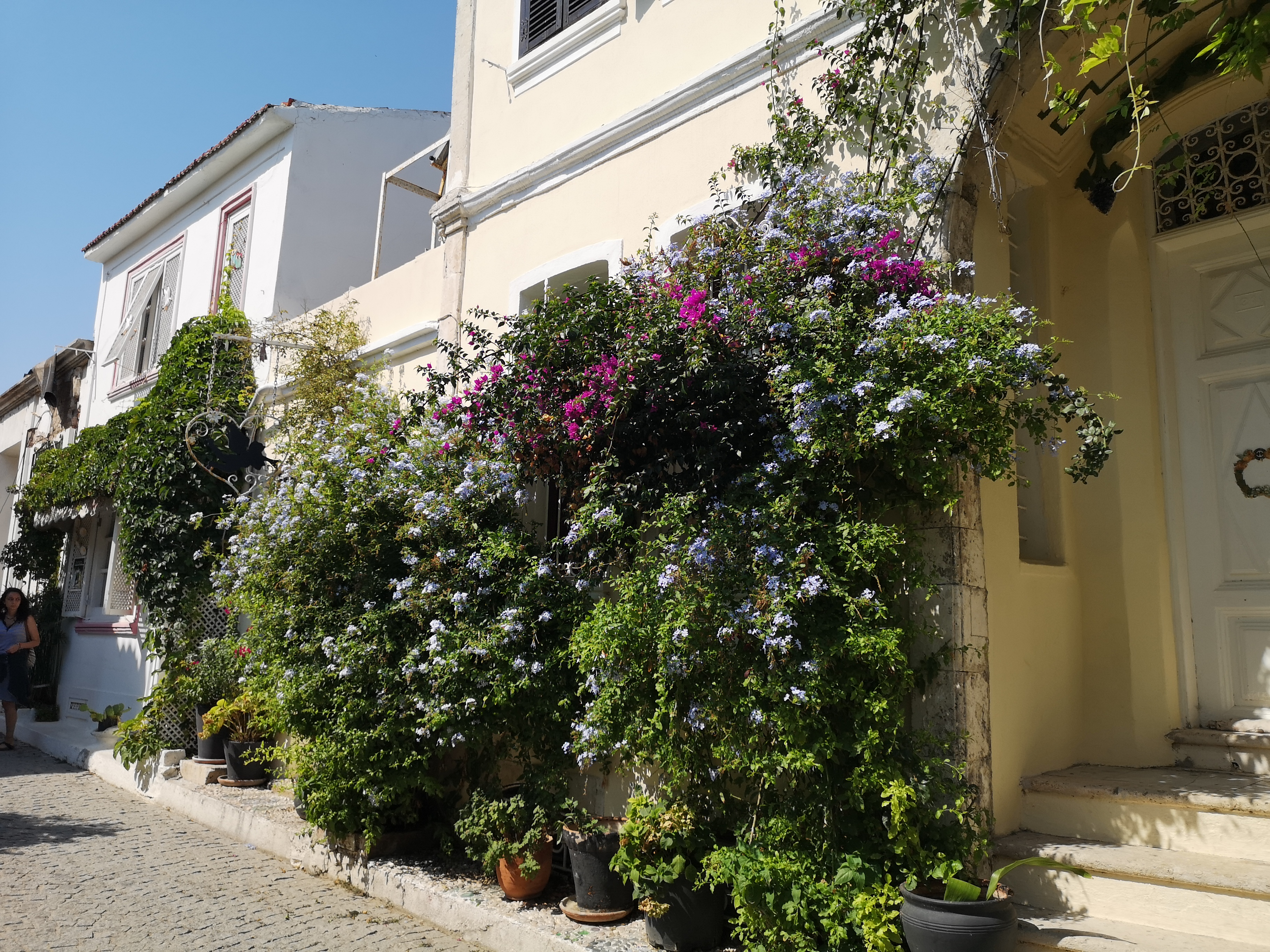
A street in Bozcaada

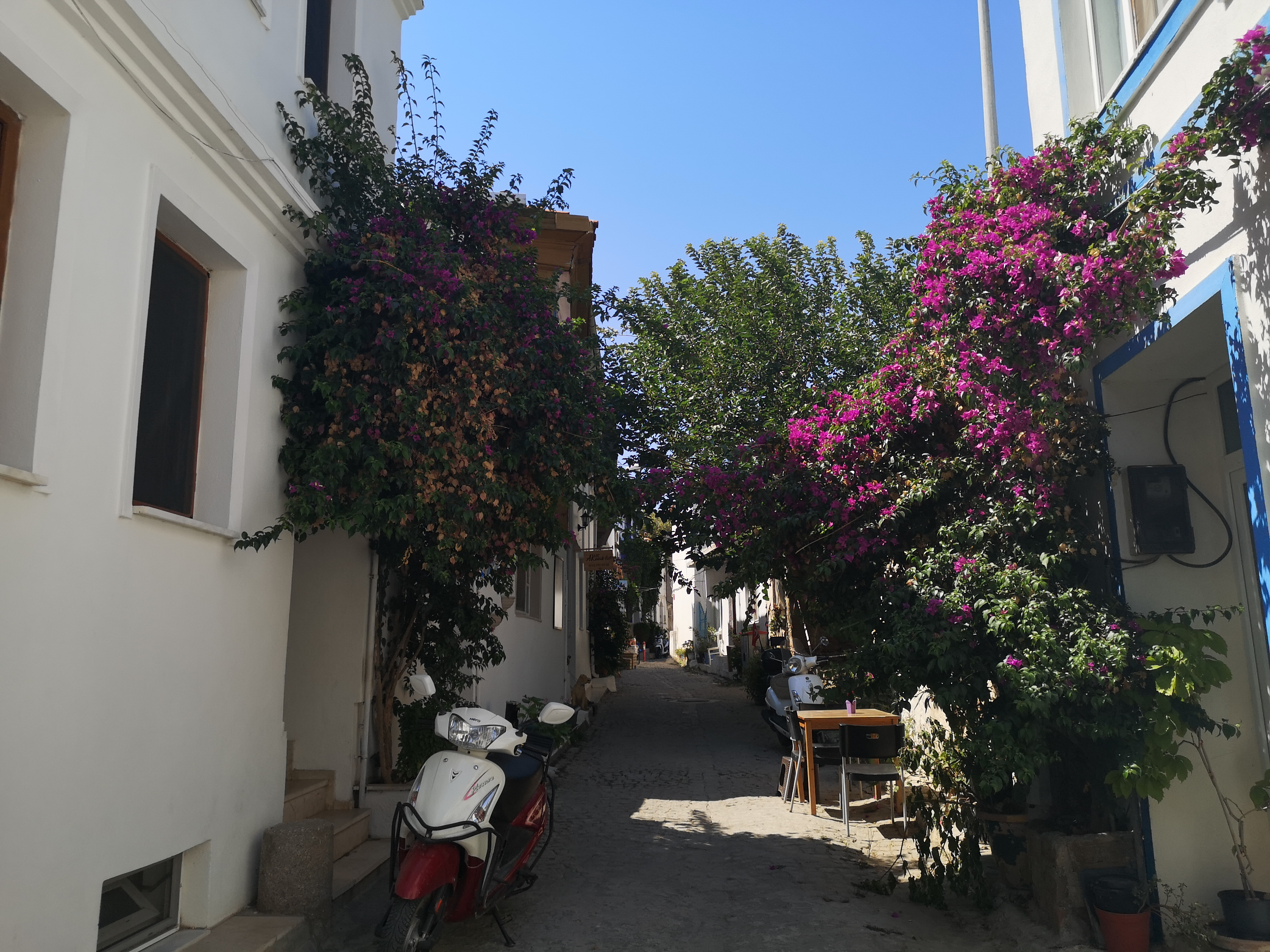
A street in Bozcaada

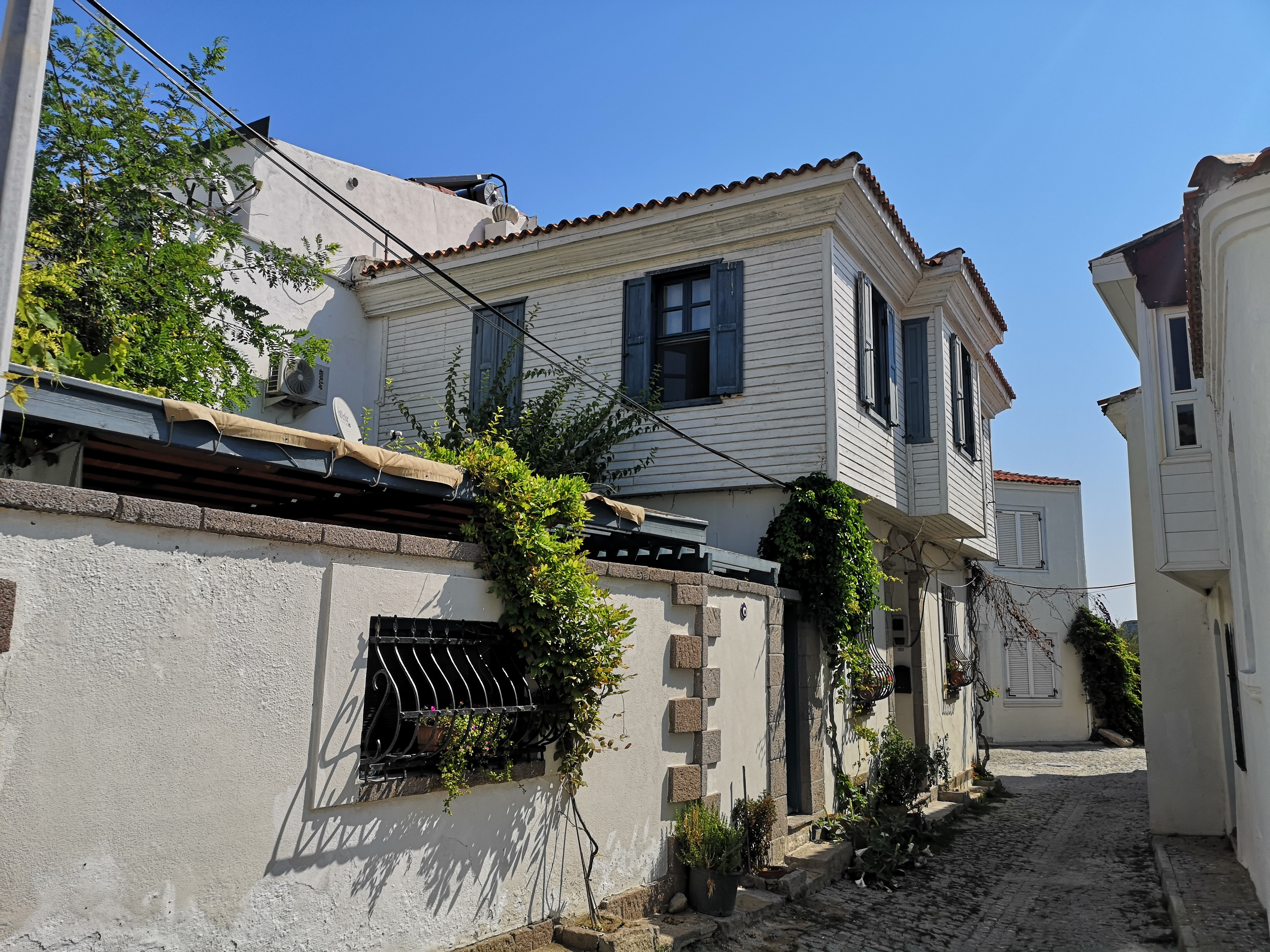
Traditional houses on a street of Bozcaada

In 1854, there were some 4,000 inhabitants on the island of Bozcaada, of which one-third were Turks. According to the Ottoman general census of 1893, the population of the island was divided as follows: 2,479 Greeks, 1,247 Turks, 103 Foreign Nationals and 6 Armenians. In 1912, when the Ecumenical Patriarchate of Constantinople conducted its own census, the population of the island was estimated to be: 5,420 Greeks and 1,200 Turks. In 1927, according to the official Turkish census, there were 2,500 Greeks and 1,247 Turks on the island.

By 2000, the official count of ethnic Greeks permanently residing on the island had dropped to 22. As of 2022, Bozcaada's population was 3,120. During summer, many more visit the island, ballooning its population to over 10,000 people. Historically the Turkish mahalle (quarter) has been located to the south and the Greek one to the north. Each quarter has its own religious institutions, mosques on the Turkish side and churches on the Greek side. The Greek quarter was burned to the ground in the fire of 1874 and rebuilt, while the Turkish quarter has an older design. The houses are architecturally different in the two districts. The grid-planned Greek district has businesses, galleries and hotels. This district is dominated by the bell tower of the Church of the Dormition of the Mother of God. On 26 July every year, the Greeks gather here to eat, dance and celebrate the feast day of St. Paraskevi.

The Turkish quarter has largely houses. The district, in its present version, dates to 1702, and contains the grave of a grand vizier, Halil Hamid Pasha. Pasha was executed on Tenedos after being exiled for scheming to replace sultan Abdülhamid I, with the "șehzade" (crown prince) Selim, the future Sultan. The grave is in the courtyard of the Alaybey Mosque, a historical monument. Another mosque, Köprülü Mehmet Paşa Mosque (also called Yali Mosque), is also a monument. The Turkish district, Alaybey, also has hammams and the Namazgah fountain.

The island has native islanders from families who have lived on the island for centuries, new wealthy immigrants from Istanbul, and wage labor immigrants from mainland Anatolia, especially Romani people in Turkey from Bayramiç.

== Economy ==
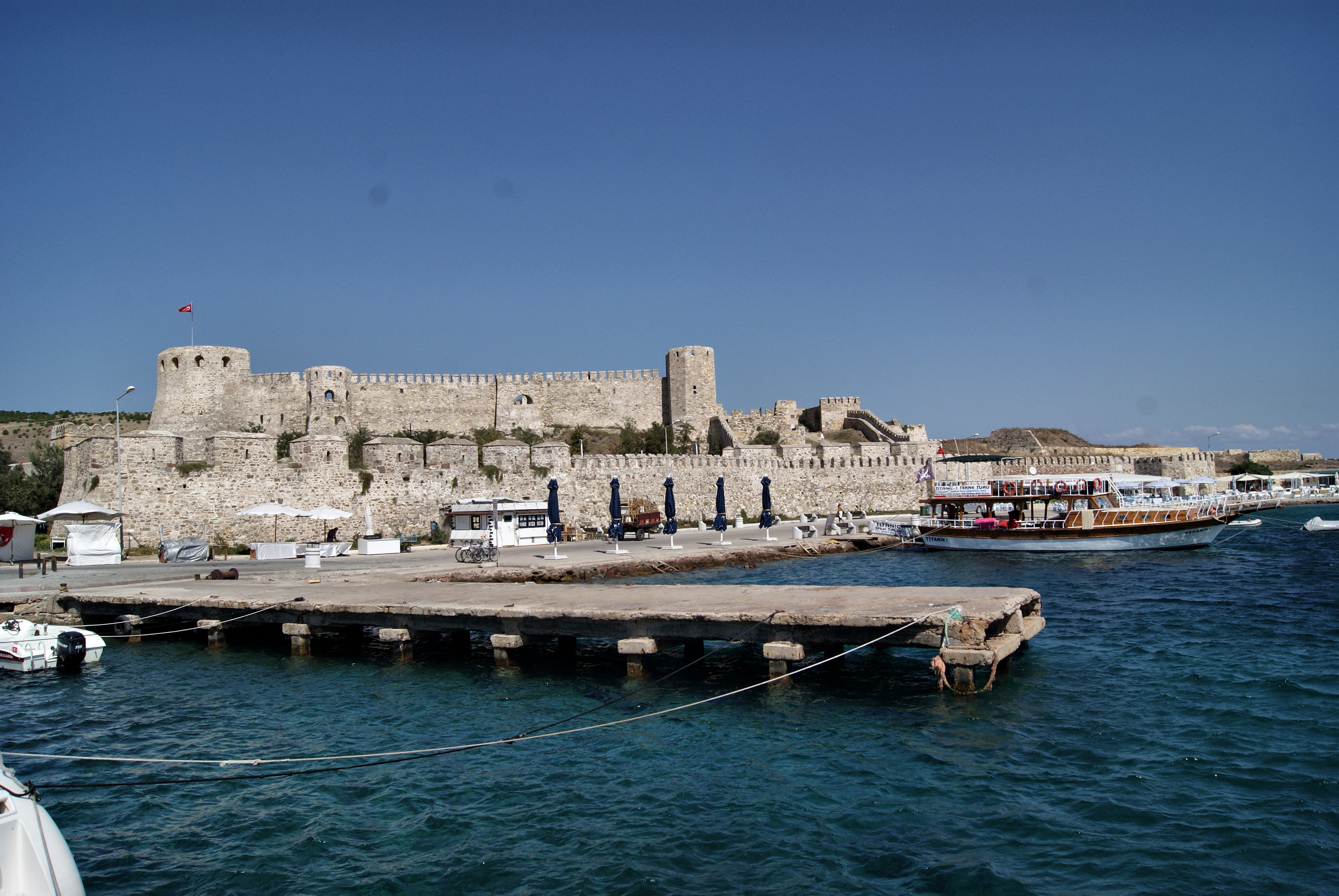
Bozcaada Castle and the port of the island

Traditional economic activities are fishing and wine production. The remainder of arable land is covered by olive trees and wheat fields. Most of the agriculture is done on the central plains and gentle hills of the island. Red poppies of the island are used to produce small quantities of sharbat and jam. Sheep and goats are grazed at hilly northeastern and southeastern part of the island which is not suitable for agriculture. The number of farmers involved in grape cultivation has gone up from 210 to 397 in the recent years, though the farm area has gone down from 1,800 hectares (18 km^{2}) to 1,200 hectares (12 km^{2}).

Tourism has been an important, but limited, economic activity since the 1970s but it developed rapidly from the 1990s onwards. The island's main attraction is the castle last rebuilt in 1815, illuminated at night, and with a view out to the open sea. The island's past is captured in a small museum, with a room dedicated to its Greek story. The town square boasts a "morning market" where fresh groceries and seafood are sold, along with the island's specialty of tomato jam. Mainlanders from Istanbul run some bars, boutiques and guesthouses. In 2010, the island was named the world's second most-beautiful island by Condé Nast's Reader Choice award. The next year, the island topped the reader's list in the same magazine for the top 10 islands in Europe. In 2012, Condé Nast again selected Bozcaada as one of the 8 best islands in the world on account of its remnants of ancient buildings, less-crowded beaches, and places to stay.

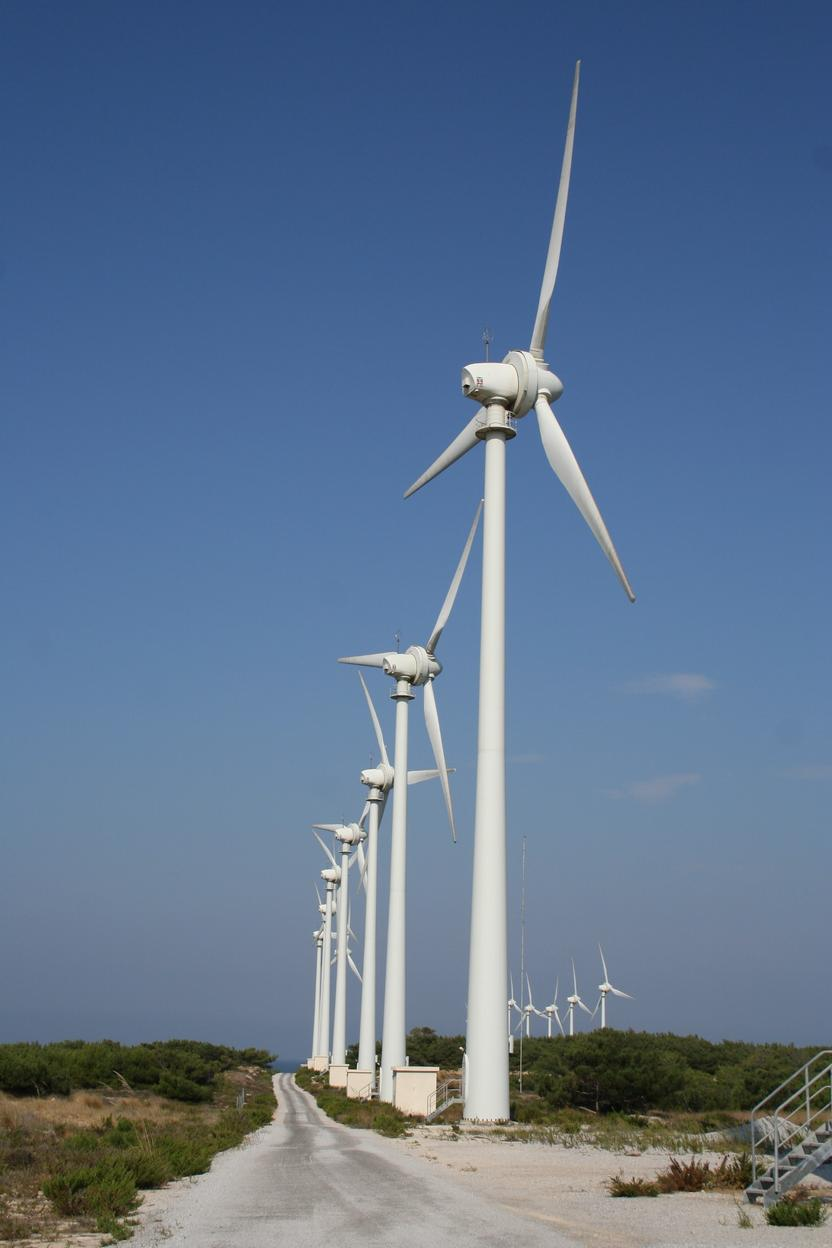
Wind farms are a common sight in Bozcaada, which is located on the path of strong wind currents, such as etesians, along the northeastern shoreline of the Aegean Sea.

Fishing plays a role in the island's economy, but similar to other Aegean islands, agriculture is a more significant economic activity. The local fishing industry is small, with the port authority counting 48 boats and 120 fishermen in 2011. Local fishing is year-round and seafood can be obtained in all seasons. The fish population has gone down over the years, resulting in a shrinking fishing industry, though increase in tourism and consequent demand for more seafood has benefited the industry. The sea off the island is one of the major routes by which fish in the Aegean sea migrate seasonally. During the migration period, boats from the outside come to the island for fishing.

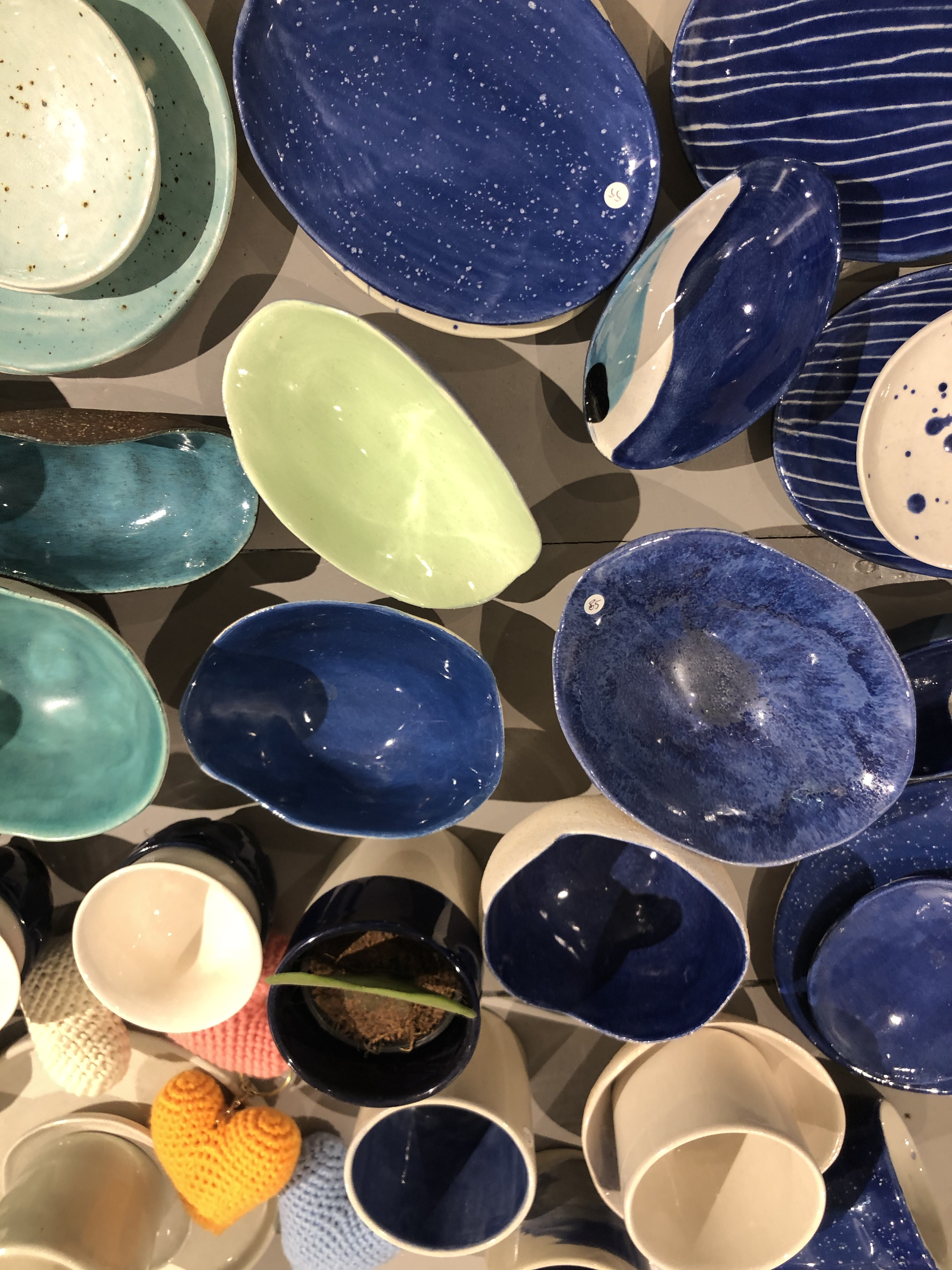
Handmade ceramics at a shop in Bozcaada

In 2000, a wind farm of 17 turbines was erected at the western cape. It has a nominal power capacity of 10.2 MW energy, and produces 30 GWh of electricity every year. This is much more than what the island needs, and the excess is transferred to mainland Anatolia through an underground and partly undersea cable. Overhead cables and pylons were avoided for esthetic reasons, preserving the scenic view. The land has an average wind speed of 6.4 m/s and a mean energy density of 324 W/^{m}at its meteorological station. This indicates significant wind energy generation potential.

A United Nations Industrial Development Organization (UNIDO) project, the International Centre for Hydrogen Energy Technologies (ICHET) set up an experimental renewables-hydrogen energy facility at the Bozcaada Governor's building on 7 October 2011. The project, supported by the Turkish Ministry of Energy and Natural Resources (MENR), is the first of its kind in the country. The power plant produces energy via a 20 kW solar photovoltaic array, and uses a 50 kW electrolyzer to store this energy as hydrogen. A fuel cell and hydrogen engine can convert this stored energy back into electricity when needed, and the experimental system can supply up to 20 households for a day.

As of 2011, the town's hospital and governor's mansion were the only two buildings in the world using hydrogen energy. A boat and a golf cart are also powered by the same system. At the governor's place, energy is captured with a rooftop 20 Kw solar array and a 30 Kw wind mill. The electricity produced is used to electrolyze water into hydrogen. This gas is stored compressed, and can be used later to generate energy or as fuel in hydrogen-powered cars. In June 2011, Henry Puna, the Prime Minister of the Cook Islands traveled to Tenedos to investigate how the island uses hydrogen energy.

In 2012, the Turkish government opened a customs office on the island, possibly opening the way for future direct travel between Greek ports and the island.

== Wine production ==
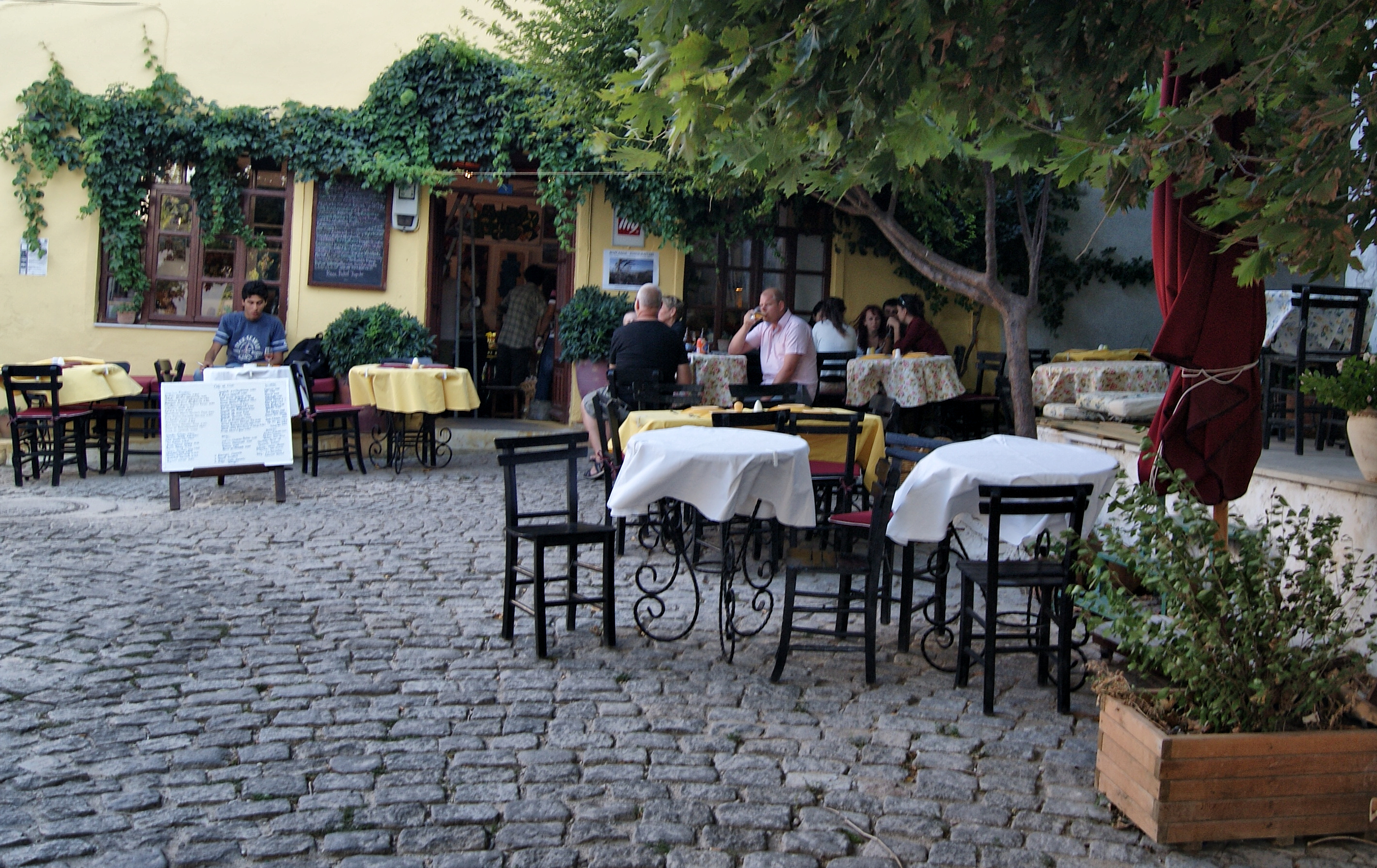
A restaurant in Bozcaada, which is famous for its local varieties of wine.

The island is windy throughout the year and this makes the climate dry and warm enough to grow grapes. In classical antiquity wine production was linked with the cult of Dionysus, while grapes were also depicted in the local currency. The local wine culture outlived the Ottoman period. Vineyards have existed on the island since antiquity and today occupy one-third of the total land of the island and 80% of its agricultural land, In the mid-1800s, the island exported 800,000 barrels of wine annually and was revered as the best wine in the Eastern Mediterranean. Ottoman traveler Evliya Çelebi wrote in the 16th century that the finest wines in the world were being produced in Tenedos. Today, the island is one of the major wine producing areas in Turkey and grows four local strains of grape: Çavuş, Karasakız (Kuntra), Altınbaş (Vasilaki), and Karalahna. However, in recent years traditional French varieties have increased in prominence, namely Cabernet Sauvignon.

Prior to 1923, wine production on the island was exclusively done by the Greek population; however, after this point, Turkish domestic wine production increased and Greeks on the island taught the Turkish population how to manufacture wine. By 1980, there were 13 wine production plants on the island. High taxes caused many of these to go out of business until 2001 when the state decreased taxes on wine and subsidized some of the producers on the island. In recent years, newer producers have relied upon Italian and French experts to improve production. In 2010, the island produced a record 5,000 tons of wine. Corvus has introduced modern wine making techniques to Tenedos. Grape harvest festivities are held the first week of September annually.

== Transportation ==
The main transportation from mainland Turkey is by ferries from Geyikli and from the town of Çanakkale. The island is roughly 5 kilometres (3.1 mi) from mainland Turkey. From the Geyikli pier, ferry travel is available for both passengers and automobiles, and takes about 35 minutes. A passenger-only ferry service from Çanakkale began running in 2009. Both run less often during the winter months. The island is seven hours by bus and then ferry from Istanbul. In 2012, Seabird Airlines began offering flights from Istanbul's Golden Horn to the island.

== Culture ==
The Turkish film Akıllı Köpek Max (Max the Smart Dog) was filmed in Bozcaada in 2012. Another Turkish film, Bi Küçük Eylül Meselesi (A Small September Affair) was filmed on the island in 2013.

The Australian author Dmetri Kakmi was born on Tenedos of Greek parents in 1961. His acclaimed memoir Mother Land about his childhood on the island was published in 2008 and reissued in a new edition in 2015.

== Notable people ==
- Abudimus, 4th-century Christian martyr
- Bozcaadalı Hasan Hüsnü Pasha (1832–1903), son of Bozcaadalı Hüseyin Pasha, Naval Minister, founder of the Istanbul Naval Museum
- Cleostratus, ancient Greek astronomer
- Harpalus, ancient Greek engineer
- Meletius II, Ecumenical Patriarch of Constantinople (1768–1769)
- Phoenix of Tenedos, ancient Greek general
- Leontios Chatziapostolou (1894-1980) - politician and lawyer

== See also ==
- Greco-Turkish relations
- Greek wine
- Imbros
- Treaty of Lausanne
- Treaty of Sèvres
- Turkish wine
- Bozcaada Castle

== Bibliography ==
Books

- Acer, Y. (2003). The Aegean Maritime Disputes and International Law. Burlington, VT: Ashgate. ISBN 978-0-7546-2273-4.
- Akpınar, F.; Saygın, N.; Karakaya, E. (2011). "Evaluation of the conservation activities in the historical settlement Tenedos–Bozcaada Island". In Brebbia, C. A.; Beriatos, E. (eds.). Sustainable Development and Planning V. Southampton, UK: WIT Press. ISBN 978-1-84564-544-1.
- Alexandris, Alexis (2003). "Religion or Ethnicity: The Identity Issue of the Minorities in Greece and Turkey". In Hirschon, Renée (ed.). Crossing the Aegean: An Appraisal of the 1923 Compulsory Population Exchange between Greece and Turkey. Berghahn Books. pp. 117–132. ISBN 9780857457028.
- Edmund Burke, ed. (1809). The Annual Register of World Events: A Review of the Year, 1807, Volume 49. London, UK : Harding & Wright.
- Apollodorus (1976). Michael Simpson (ed.). Gods and Heroes of the Greeks. Amherst, MA: University of Massachusetts Press. ISBN 978-0870232060.
- Ashley, J.R. (1998). The Macedonian Empire: The Era of Warfare under Philip II and Alexander the Great. Jefferson, NC: McFarland & Company. ISBN 978-0-7864-1918-0.
- Bağış, A.İ. (1984). Britain and the Struggle for the Integrity of the Ottoman Empire: Sir Robert Ainslie's Embassy to Istanbul, 1776–1794. Isis.
- Biographisches Lexikon. Munich: Südosteuropäische Arbeiten, Institut zur Erforschung des Deutschen Volkstums im Süden und Südosten in (Vol. 75). Oldenbourg Verlag. 1976. p. 333. ISBN 9783486492415.
- "Bozcaada". Brill Encyclopedia of Islam. Brill. 2012.
- Clavijo, R.G. (1859). Narrative of the Embassy of Ruy Gonzalez de Clavijo to the Court of Timour at Samarcand, A.D. 1403–6. Hakluyt Society.
- Clogg, R. (2003). Minorities in Greece aspects of a plural society. Londres: Hurst. pp. xiii. ISBN 9781850657064. Archived from the original on 10 May 2016.
- Cook, E.T. (1903). A Popular Handbook to the Greek and Roman Antiquities in the British Museum. London, UK: MacMillan.
- Cramer, J.A. (1832). A Geographical and Historical description of Asia Minor; With a Map. Oxford University Press.
- Crowley, R. (2011). City of Fortune: How Venice Ruled the Seas. New York, NY: Random House. ISBN 978-0-679-64426-2.
- Dankoff, R. (2004). An Ottoman Mentality: The World of Evliya Çelebi. Brill. ISBN 9789004137158.
- Disraeli, I.; Disraeli, B. (1859). Curiosities of Literature, Volume 3. London: Frederick Warne and company.
- Durmus, Hüseyin (2006). Bozcaada' nın sosyo-ekonomik yapısı ve kültürü. Osmangazi Üniversitesi. p. 92. Archived from the original on 23 March 2012.
- Engels, D.W. (1980). Alexander the Great and the Logistics of the Macedonian Army. Berkeley: University of California Press. p. 31.
- Farnell, L.R. (1907). The Cults of the Greek States. Oxford: Clarendon Press. pp. 161–166.
- Finkel, C. (2005). The History of the Ottoman Empire: Osman's Dream. Cambridge, MA: Basic Books. ISBN 978-0-465-02397-4.
- Clements R. Markham, ed. (1878). The Geographical Magazine: Volume V-1878. London, UK: Trübner & Co.
- Günther, Dionysios Solomos. Übers. und kommentiert von Hans-Christian (2000). Werke. Stuttgart: Steiner. pp. 272–273. ISBN 978-3-515-07249-6.
- Hall, R.C. (2000). Balkan Wars 1912–1913: Prelude to the First World War. New York: Routledge. p. 64. ISBN 9780203138052.
- Hands, A.W. (1907). Common Greek Coins:Volume 1, The Coinage of Athens, Corinth, Aegina,... London, UK: Spink & Son.
- Hughes, D.D. (1991). Human Sacrifice in Ancient Greece. New York, NY: Routledge. ISBN 9780415034838.
- Human Rights Watch (1992). Denying Human Rights and Ethnic Identity: The Greeks in Turkey. Human Rights Watch. p. 27. ISBN 9781564320568.
- Matthew J. Gibney; Randall Hansen, eds. (2005). Immigration and Asylum: From 1900 to the Present, Volume 2. Santa Barbara, CA: ABC-CLIO. ISBN 978-1576077962.
- İslam Ansiklopedisi, volume 26. Türkiye Diyanet Vakfı. 2002. ISBN 9789753894067.
- Jacoby, D. (2001). "Changing economic patterns in Latin Romania: The impact of the West" ( (PDF)). In Angeliki E. Laiou; Roy Parviz Mottahedeh (eds.). The Crusades from the Perspective of Byzantium and the Muslim World. Washington, DC: Dumbarton Oaks Research Library and Collection. Archived from the original on 18 March 2009.
- Jaques, T. (2007). Dictionary of Battles and Sieges: P.Z. Westport, CT: Greenwood Press. ISBN 978-0-313-33536-5.
- Jenkins, G. (2008). Political Islam in Turkey: Running West, Heading East?. New York, NY: MacMillan. ISBN 978-1-4039-6883-8.
- Jones, H.A. (1928). The War in the Air: being the story of the part played in the great war by the Royal Air Force. Oxford: Clarendon Press. p. 25.
- Korfmann, M. (1986). "Troy: Topography and navigation". In Machteld J. Mellink (ed.). Troy and the Trojan War: Symposium Held at Bryn Mawr College, 1984. Bryn Mawr, PA: Bryn Mawr College.
- Kiminas, D. (2009). Orthodox Christianity Vol. I: The Ecumenical Patriarchate. Wildside Press. ISBN 9781434458766.
- Leaf, Walter; Strabo (1923). Strabo on the Troad. Cambridge University Press.
- Lemprière, John (1804). A Classical Dictionary, Containing a Copious Account of All the Proper Names Mentioned. London. p. 61.
- Levine, L.A. (2010). Frommer's Turkey. Hoboken, NJ: Wiley. ISBN 978-0-470-40360-0.
- Manheim, C.K. (1996). Dionysos : archetypal image of the indestructible life (1st paperback printing, in the Mythos series. ed.). Princeton, N.J.: Princeton University Press. pp. 190–191. ISBN 9780691029153.
- McArthur, J.; Stanier, J. (2010). The Naval Chronicle: Volume 28, July.December 1812:Containing a General and Biographical History of the Royal Navy of the United Kingdom with a Variety of Original Papers on Nautical Subjects. Cambridge University Press. p. 21. ISBN 9781108018678.
- Hydrographic Office, Admiralty, Great Britain (1908). Mediterranean Pilot, Volume IV, fourth edition. Great Britain Hydrographic Department, Admiralty.
- Michell, H. (1940). The Economics of Ancient Greece. Cambridge University Press. ASIN B0006D8AYO.
- Morewood, S. (1838). A Philosophical and Statistical History of the Inventions and Customs of Ancient and Modern Nations in the Manufacture and Use of Inebriating Lliquors. London: Longman and Company. p. 417.
- Müller, K.O. (1839). The History and the Antiquities of the Doric Race. London: John Murray, Albemarle Street.
- Nagy, Gregory (2012). Homer the Preclassic. Berkeley, CA: University of California Press. p. 184.
- Neilson, R. (2009). Bronze Age Connections (PDF). University of Canterbury PhD thesis.
- Newton, C.T. (1865). Travels and Discoveries in the Levant. Cambridge University Press. ISBN 978-1-108-01742-8.
- Nicol, D.M. (1992). Byzantium and Venice: A Study in Diplomatic and Cultural Relations. London: Cambridge University Press. p. 278. ISBN 9780521428941.
- Oran, Baskin (2003). "The Story of Those who Stayed: Lessons from Articles 1 and 2 of the 1923 Convention". In Hirschon, Renée (ed.). Crossing the Aegean: An Appraisal of the 1923 Compulsory Population Exchange between Greece and Turkey. Berghahn Books. pp. 97–115. ISBN 9780857457028.
- Pache, C.O. (2004). Baby and Child Heroes in Ancient Greece. University of Illinois. pp. 141–142. ISBN 978-0-252-02929-5.
- Pekin, F.; Yılmaz, H. (2008). Türkiye'nin kültür mirası: 100 kale. NTV. p. 59. ISBN 9789756690901.
- Pitcher, D.E. (1968). An Historical Geography of the Ottoman Empire from Earliest Times to the End. London, UK: Shield Press.
- Price, R.S. (2006). Homeric Whispers: Intimations of Orthodoxy in the Iliad and Odyssey. Skylax Press. p. 36. ISBN 9780910865111. "The line "of the silver bow" is a specific reference to the Sminthian cult of Apollo, as opposed to other Greek versions of the God."
- Erica Chenoweth and Adria Lawrence, ed. (2010). Rethinking Violence: States and Non-State Actors in Conflict. Cambridge, MA: MIT Press. ISBN 978-0-262-01420-5.
- Ridgeway, W. (1892). The Origin of Metallic Currency and Weight Standards. Cambridge University Press.
- Metin Heper; Sabri Sayari, eds. (2012). The Routledge Handbook of Modern Turkey. New York, NY: Routledge. ISBN 978-0-415-55817-4.
- Runciman, S. (1968). The Great Church in Captivity: A Study of the Patriarchate of Constantinople. Cambridge, UK:Cambridge University Press. ISBN 978-0-521-31310-0.
- Rutherford, T. (2011). National Geographic Traveler: Istanbul and Western Turkey. National Geographic. ISBN 9781426207082.
- Sarton, G. (1952). Ancient Science through the Golden Age of Greece. Cambridge, MA: Harvard University Press.
- Setton, K.M. (1991). Venice, Austria and the Turks in the Seventeenth Century. American Philosophical Society. ISBN 978-0-87169-192-7.
- Stavrides, T. (2001). The Sultan of Vezirs: The Life and Times of the Ottoman Grand Vezir Mahmud Pasha Angelovi. (1453–1474). Leiden, Netherlands: Brill. ISBN 978-9004121065.
- Sugar, Peter F. (1996). Southeastern Europe Under Ottoman Rule: 1354–1804. University of Washington Press. ISBN 9780295803630.
- Karin Ådahl, ed. (2006). The Sultan's Procession: The Swedish Embassy to Sultan Mehmed IV in 1657–1658 and the Rålamb paintings. Swedish Research Institute in Istanbul. ISBN 9789186884185.
- Tafur, Pero (2004). Travels and Adventures 1435–1439. Oxon, UK: RoutledgeCurzon. p. 113. ISBN 9780415344753.
- Takaoğlu, Turan; Bamyacı, Onur (2007). "Continuity and change in rural land use on Tenedos/Bozcaada". In Takaoğlu (ed.). Ethnoarcheological Investigations in Rural Anatolia. Archived from the original on 31 March 2012.
- "Tenedos". Brill's New Pauly. Brill. 2012.
- Thorburn, J.E. Jr. (2005). Facts on File Companion to Classical Drama. New York, NY: Facts on File. ISBN 978-0-8160-5202-8.
- Tozer, H.F. (1897). A History of Ancient Geography. Cambridge University Press. ISBN 9780819601384.
- Treadgold, W. (1997). A History of the Byzantine State and Society. Stanford, CA: Stanford University Press. ISBN 978-0-8047-2630-6.
- Turnbull, S. (2003). The Ottoman Empire, 1326–1699. Oxford, UK: Osprey Publishing. ISBN 978-1-84176-569-3.
- Tyrrell, H. (1859). History of the Russian Empire. The London Publishing Company.
- Ussher, James (2003). The Annals of the World. Master Books. p. 543. ISBN 9781614582557.
- Veremis, J.S.K.; Thanos, M. (2010). Modern Greece: a history since 1821 (1. publ. ed.). Malden, MA: Wiley-Blackwell. p. 72. ISBN 978-1-4051-8681-0.
- Vergil. The Aeneid (Book 2).
- White, S. (2011). The Climate of Rebellion in the Early Modern Ottoman Empire. Cambridge, UK: Cambridge University Press. ISBN 978-1-107-00831-1.
- Williams, C.H. (1989). Anemurium: The Roman and Early Byzantine pottery. Pontificial Institute for Medieval Studies. ISBN 978-0-88844-365-6.
- Willoughby, H.R. (1929). Pagan Regeneration: A Study of Mystery Initiations in the Graeco–Roman World. Kessinger Publishing, LLC. ISBN 978-0766180833.
- Witt, R.E. (1971). Isis in the Ancient World. Baltimore, MD: Johns Hopkins University Press. ISBN 978-0-8018-5642-6.
- Wood, M. (1996). In Search of the Trojan War, Updated Edition. University of California Press, Berkeley and Los Angeles. ISBN 9780520215993.

Journals

- Babul, E. (May 2004). "Belonging to Imbros: Citizenship and Sovereignty in the Turkish Republic" (PDF). European Studies Centre. Nationalism, Society and Culture: 4. Archived from the original (PDF) on 19 February 2012. "As opposed to all the appointed structure of an ordinary district administration in Turkey, the two islands were to have a semi-autonomous administrative structure, organized around a district council composed of ten members all of whom would be elected by and among the islanders for two years."
- Barnes, C.L.H. (2006). "The ferries of Tenedos". Historia: Zeitschrift für Alte Geschichte. 55 (2): 167–177. JSTOR 4436806.
- ERÜNSAL, I.E. (2004). "Ottoman Foundation Libraries in the Age of Reform: The Final Period" (PDF). Libri. 54 (4): 247–255. doi:10.1515/libr.2004.247. S2CID 144628109. Archived from the original (PDF) on 9 December 2006.
- Gungor, Afsin (2012). "Evaluation of the studies carried out on wind characteristics of the western part of Turkey". Niğde Üniversitesi Mühendislik Bilimleri Dergisi. 1 (1): 41–49. Archived from the original on 11 April 2018.
- İncecİk, S.; Erdoğmuş, F. (1995). "An investigation of the wind power potential on the western coast of Anatolia". Renewable Energy. 6 (7): 863–865. doi:10.1016/0960-1481(94)00058-E.
- Kaldis, W.P. (1979). "Background for Conflict: Greece, Turkey, and the Aegean Islands, 1912–1914". Journal of Modern History. 51 (2): D1119–D1146. doi:10.1086/242039. JSTOR 1881125. S2CID 144142861.
- Ozerdem, B.; Turkeli, H.M. (2005). "Wind energy potential estimation and micrositting on İzmir Institute of Technology Campus, Turkey" (PDF). Renewable Energy. 30 (10): 1623–1633. doi:10.1016/j.renene.2004.11.010. hdl:11147/2009.
- Quinn, T.J. (1971). "Political groups in Lesbos during the Peloponnesian war". Historia: Zeitschrift für Alte Geschichte. 20 (4): 405–417. JSTOR 4435207.
- Rose, C.B. (2008). "Separating fact from fiction in the Aiolian migration". Hesperia. 77 (3): 399–430. doi:10.2972/hesp.77.3.399. S2CID 59428004.
- Sevinç, N.; Takaoğlu, T. (1 January 2004). "The early bronze age on Tenedos/Bozcaada". Studia Troica: 135–140.
- Vaughn, Robert; Allon, Henry (1877). British Quarterly Review. Vol. 66. p. 456.
- Çaliskan, V. (2010). "Opportunism for Tourism and Dialogue between Civilisations" (PDF). Shima: The International Journal of Research into Island Cultures. 4 (2).

Newspapers and magazines

- "The Governor of Tenedos" (PDF). New York Times. 23 December 1912.
- Harte, J. (5 August 2011). "Amid doubts, Turkey powers ahead with hydrogen technologies". InsideClimate News.
- Parla, Katie (6 July 2012). "On a Turkish Isle, Winds Tend the Vines". The New York Times.
- Rutherford, T. (12 September 2009). "Unspoilt and Cheap, can Bozcaada really be in the Med?". The Independent.
- Tsolakidou, Stella (16 February 2012). "Customs Offices to Open in Gökçeada and Bozcaada Islands". Greek Reporter.

Web sources

- "Akilli Köpek Mexin Çekimlerine Başlandi". Ezine Türk. 2011.
- "Altyapi durumu". Bozcaada Kaymakamligi. Archived from the original on 7 July 2012.
- "BAĞ BOZUMU FESTİVALİ". Bozcaada Belediyesi'ne aittir. Archived from the original on 25 October 2012.
- "Bozcaada Ferry Timetable". GESTA. Deniz Ula..m Tur. Archived from the original on 8 June 2012.
- "Bozcaada Kimisis Teodoku Rum Ortodoks Kilisesi Vakfi v. Turkey (no. 2)". European Court of Human Rights.
- "Bozcaada Wind Farm". The Wind Power.
- "Calendar, 2012-Overviews and Downloads". European Athletics. Archived from the original on 30 August 2012.
- "Condé Nast: Reader's Choice Awards, Top Islands in the World". Condé Nast. Archived from the original on 25 October 2012.
- "First hydrogen energy production on a Turkish Island has started on Bozcaada". United Nations Industrial Development Organization. 7 October 2011.
- "Getting to Bozcaada". Bozcaada Rehberi. Archived from the original on 6 December 2011.
- "Κατάλογος Πατριαρχών: Μελέτιος Β'". Ecumenical Patriarchate of Constantinople.
- Madd River Designs. "Tenedos–Bozcaada Grape & Wine". Tenedos-ege.com. Archived from the original on 20 February 2012.
- "NÜFUS DURUMU". T.C. BOZCAADA KAYMAKAMLIĞI. Archived from the original on 7 July 2012.
- "Top 10 Islands in Europe". Conde Nast Traveler. 2011. Archived from the original on 13 October 2012.
- "Seaplane Company Ready to Fly to Dry Capital Ankara". The Journal of Turkish Weekly. 2012.
- Yale, Pat (2012). "Return to Tenedos–A look at Bozcaada". Today's Zaman. Archived from the original on 1 September 2012.
