= Michel Goma =

French fashion designer (1932–2022)

- Born: 12 March 1932; Moncrabeau, Lot-et-Garonne, France
- Died: 18 April 2022 (aged 90)
- Occupation: Fashion designer

Michel Goma (12 March 1932 – 18 April 2022) was a French fashion designer who was the creative director of Balenciaga from 1987 to 1992, after the label was relaunched following a 19-year closure.

== Early life ==
Goma was born on 12 March 1932 in Moncrabeau, Lot-et-Garonne. He studied at the Ecole de la Chambre Syndicale de la Couture Parisienne.

== Career ==
Goma began his career working for Jean Patou. In the early 1960s, Goma launched his own label.

From 1963 to 1974, Goma was the artistic director at Jean Patou, and revitalized the brand by incorporating bold geometric patterns and bright colours, appealing to a younger audience. His contributions helped establish Patou as a major force in the fashion world. Goma's work during this period is regarded as some of the most influential in the history of French fashion.

In 1987, Goma was appointed as the artistic director of Balenciaga. He modernized the brand's image by introducing sleek, minimalist designs while staying true to its heritage. His collections during this period were met with critical acclaim and helped Balenciaga regain its status.

After leaving Balenciaga in 1992, Goma continued to work as a freelance designer and consultant.

Death

Goma died in 2022.
