= André-Joseph Lafitte-Clavé =

- Born: 1740; Clavé, Moncrabeau
- Died: 1794 (aged 53–54); Perpignan
- Other name: André-Joseph de Lafitte
- Education: Ecole royale du génie de Mézières
- Military career
- Allegiance: France
- Branch: French Army
- Rank: Maréchal de Camp
- Known for: French training mission in Ottoman Empire

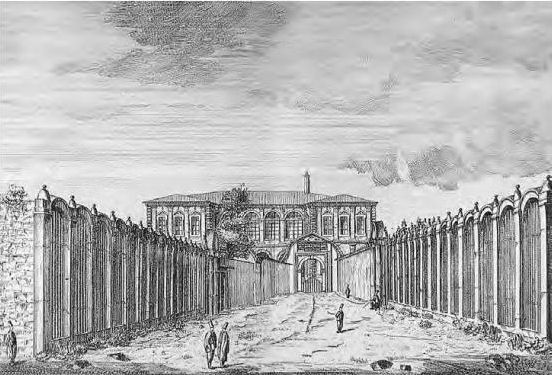
The Imperial School of Engineering Muhendishane, in Tableau des nouveaux reglemens de l'Empire Ottoman by Mahmoud Rayf Efendi, Constantinople, 1789

André-Joseph Lafitte-Clavé, also André-Joseph de Lafitte (1740 in Clavé, a mansion of Moncrabeau – 1794 in Perpignan) was a French Army engineering officer. He became Colonel on 1 April 1791, and Maréchal de Camp on 25 October 1792. He was a graduate of the Ecole royale du génie de Mézières (English: Royal engineering school of Mézières).

He is especially known for his participation to a French mission in the Ottoman Empire under Louis XVI from 1784 to 1788. The mission, from 1783, was sent to the Ottoman Empire to train the Turks in naval warfare and fortification building. Up to the French Revolution in 1789, about 300 French artillery officers and engineers were active in the Ottoman Empire to modernize and train artillery units.

From 1784, André-Joseph Lafitte-Clavé and Joseph-Monnier de Courtois instructed engineering drawings and techniques in the new Turkish engineering school Mühendishâne-i Hümâyûn established by the Grand-Vizier Halil Hamid Pasha. Mostly French textbooks were used on mathematics, astronomy, engineering, weapons, war techniques and navigation.

The French experts had to leave in 1788, as a condition of the peace treaty between Russia and Turkey. Some returned to Constantinople, but eventually all instructors had to leave with the end of the Franco-Ottoman alliance in 1798.

== See also ==
- Ottoman military reform efforts
