= Frederick B. Thurber =

American sailor (1883–1971)

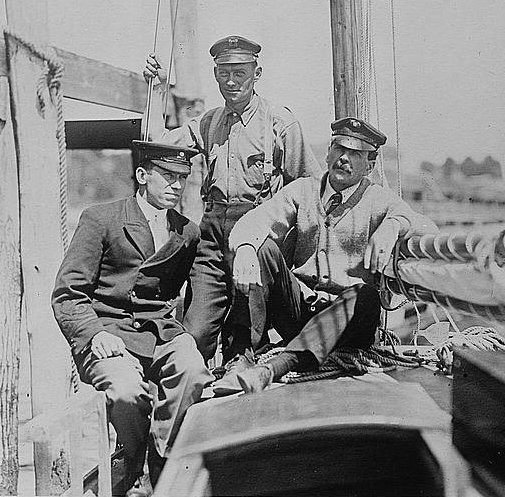
Thurber, Theodore R. Goodwin and Thomas Fleming Day in 1911

Frederick Butler Thurber (1883 – 1971) was a sailing champion. The Frederick B. Thurber Invitational Trophy Race is named for him. He, Theodore R. Goodwin and Thomas Fleming Day sailed the Atlantic Ocean in the Sea Bird.
