= Achaiion =

Town in the Tenedian Peraia of the ancient Troad

Coordinates: 39°49′19″N 26°09′57″E

Achaiion or Achaeïum or Achaeum (Ancient Greek: Ἀχαίιον) was a town in the Tenedian Peraia of the ancient Troad. Strabo states that Achaeium marked the beginning of the part of the mainland belonging to Tenedos.

The legend AX (ACH) which some bronze coins found in this region bear is thought to refer to Ach(aiion) by Louis Robert, but others attribute the coins to Achilleion.

Its site is located near Hantepe, Asiatic Turkey.
