= Islander (yawl) =

Second yacht sailed the world single-handedly

History

United States
- Name: Islander
- Owner: Harry Pidgeon
- Builder: Harry Pidgeon
- Cost: $1,000
- Laid down: 1917
- Launched: 1918
- Fate: Wrecked, 1947

General characteristics
- Type: Yawl
- Displacement: 12 long tons (12 t)
- Length: 34 ft (10 m) o/a; 27 ft 6 in (8.38 m) w/l
- Beam: 10 ft 10 in (3.30 m)
- Draft: 5 ft (1.5 m)
- Sail plan: Gaff rig; 635 sq ft (59 m^{2})
- Crew: 1

Islander was the 34-foot yawl with which Harry Pidgeon sailed around the world single-handedly from 1921 to 1925. Pidgeon thus became the second person, after Joshua Slocum, to do so. He accounts for his adventures in his book, Around the World Single-Handed: The Cruise of the Islander (1932).

== History ==
Islander was modelled on Sea Bird, a 25-foot V-bottom boat that was designed by Charles D. Mower with input from Captain Thomas Fleming Day. Pidgeon built Islander from 1917 to 1918 using only $1,000 of materials. Islander was built mostly from oak, Douglas fir, and Oregon pine. Writing about his voyage later, Pidgeon commented that Islander "proved to sail well, and all remarked on the ease with which she handled."
