= Abudimus =

3rd and 4th-century Greek Christian martyr and saint

Saint, Martyr
- Died: 305 island of Tenedos, Aegean sea (modern-day Bozcaada, Çanakkale, Turkey)
- Venerated in: Catholic Church, Eastern Orthodox Church
- Feast: July 15

Abudimus (Greek: Ἅγιος Ἀβούδιμος; died 305) was a Greek Christian martyr also known as Abudemius of Tenedos.

Abudimus was tortured during the Diocletian persecution on the island of Tenedos, before dying in 305. The reason for his martyrdom was that he did not want to eat meat sacrificed to idols.

Abudimus is regarded as a saint by both the Roman Catholic Church and the Eastern Orthodox Church, with a feast day of July 15.

== Sources ==
- Holweck, F. G. A Biographical Dictionary of the Saints. St. Louis, MO: B. Herder Book Co. 1924.
