= Leontios Chatziapostolou =

Greek lawyer and politician

- Born: 1894; Tenedos, Greece
- Died: 16 June 1980 (aged 85–86)
- Occupations: lawyer, journalist, politician

Leontios Chatziapostolou (Greek: Λεόντιος Χατζηαποστόλου; 1894 – 16 June 1980), son of Dimitrios, was a Greek lawyer and politician. He served as member of parliament and minister.

== Biography ==
He was born in Tenedos in 1894. He moved to Thessaloniki a bit after the city's incorporation into Greece in 1912. He studied law in the University of Athens and was appointed deputy governor of Kavala during WWI. He cooperated closely with the lawyer and politician Dimitrios Digkas. He worked as a lawyer in Thessaloniki. In 20 March 1949, during the Greek Civil War, he was elected president of the Thessaloniki Bar Association, supported by a set of political forces. He was elected MP of the former municipality of Thessaloniki with the Centre Union in the 1963 elections. He also worked in journalism, as he wrote articles in the "Nea Alithia" ("Νέα Αλήθεια", New Truth) newspaper. He died in 1980 aged 86 years old and was buried in the First Cemetery of Athens. His widow, Niki, died in December 1986. They had a son and a daughter.
