= Halil Hamid Pasha =

Grand Vizier of the Ottoman Empire from 1782 to 1785

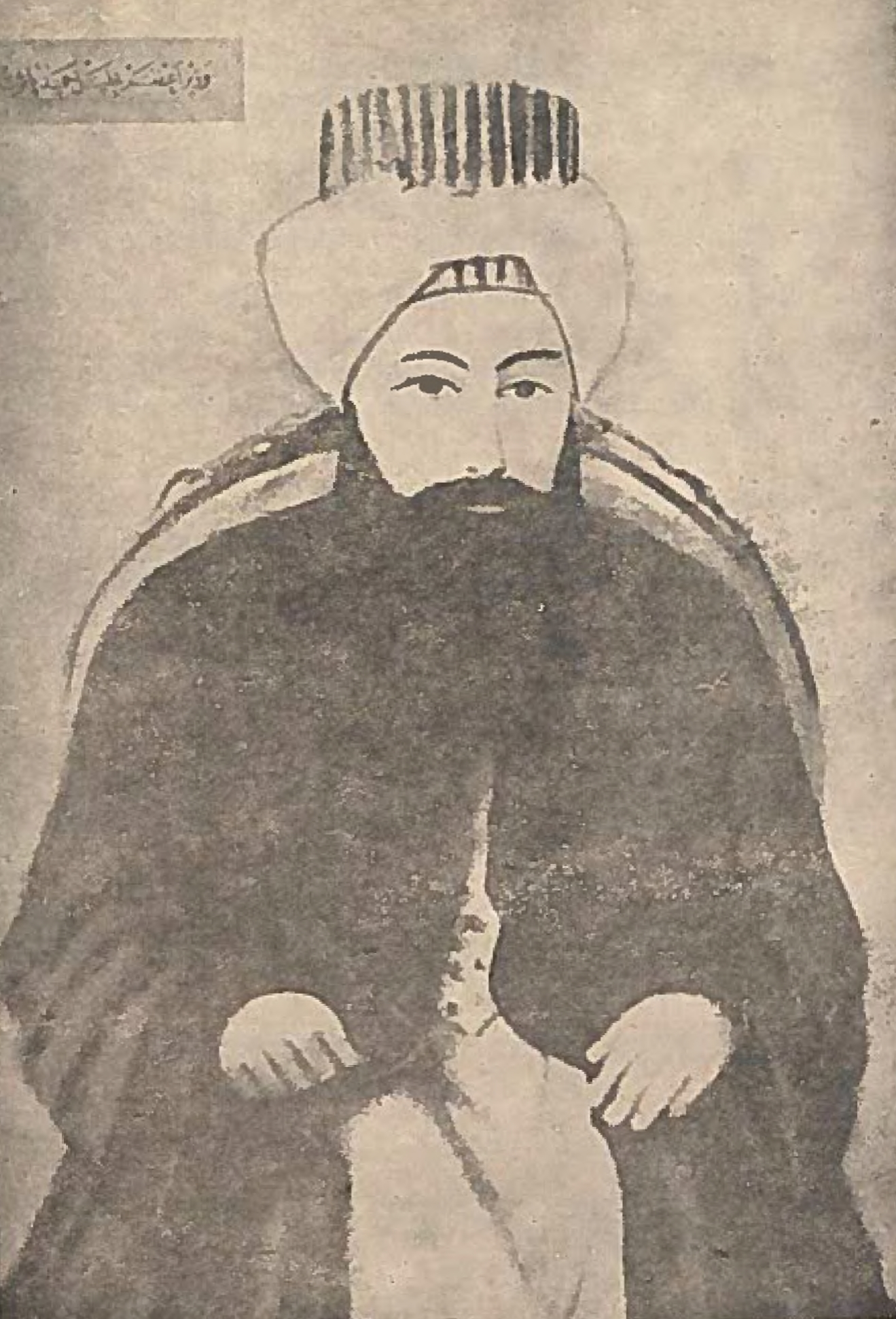
Halil Hamid Paşa

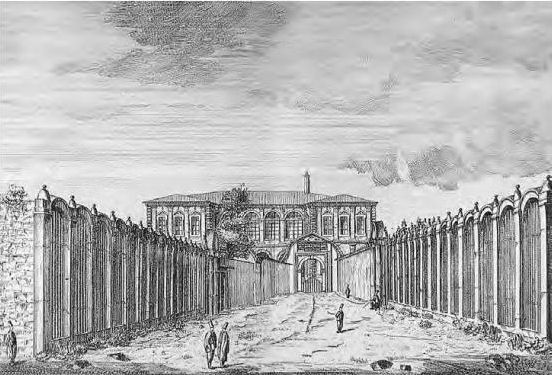
The Imperial School of Engineering Muhendishane, in Tableau des nouveaux reglemens de l'Empire Ottoman by Mahmoud Rayf Efendi, Constantinople, 1789.

Halil Hamid Pasha, also Khaleel Hameed Basha (1736–1785) was the grand vizier of the Ottoman Empire from 31 December 1782 to 30 April 1785. He was especially instrumental in inviting foreign experts, especially French ones, to the Ottoman Empire from 1784.

As a result, French missions were sent to the Ottoman Empire to train the Ottoman Navy in naval warfare and fortification building. Up to the French Revolution in 1789, about 300 French artillery officers and engineers were active in the Ottoman Empire to modernize and train artillery units.

From 1784, André-Joseph Lafitte-Clavé and Joseph-Monnier de Courtois instructed engineering drawings and techniques in the new Turkish engineering school Mühendishâne-i Hümâyûn established by Halil Hamid Pasha. Mostly French textbooks were used on mathematics, astronomy, engineering, weapons, war techniques and navigation.

Halil Hamid Pasha had argued for a path towards modernization for the Ottoman Empire, and a conciliatory stance against Russia, but he was ultimately suspected of plotting for the succession of Abdul Hamid I and future ruler Selim III, due to reactionary intrigues and the rise of the anti-French sentiment. Secret correspondence between Selim III and Louis XVI was discovered, and a plot against the current ruler was alleged. Halil Hamid Pasha was beheaded, and the war party rose to power, leading the Ottoman Empire to war with Russia in the Russo-Turkish War (1787–1792).

The French experts ultimately had to leave in 1788 with the start of the hostilities. Some returned to Constantinople, but eventually all instructors had to leave with the end of the Franco-Ottoman alliance in 1798.

Halil Hamid Pasha's son-in-law was Safranbolulu Izzet Mehmet Pasha, who served as grand vizier from 1794 to 1798.

== See also ==
- Franco-Ottoman alliance
- List of Ottoman grand viziers
- Ottoman military reform efforts

== Notes ==
Political offices
Preceded by Yeğen Hacı Mehmed Pasha	Grand Vizier of the Ottoman Empire; 31 December 1782 – 30 April 1785	Succeeded by Şahin Ali Pasha
