= Seabird Airlines =

- Founded: 11 February 2010; 16 years ago
- Ceased operations: 2015
- Hubs: İstanbul and Alaçatı
- Fleet size: 4
- Destinations: 10
- Headquarters: Istanbul
- Key people: Kürşad Arusan (Founder and Chairman of the Board)
- Website: http://www.flyseabird.com

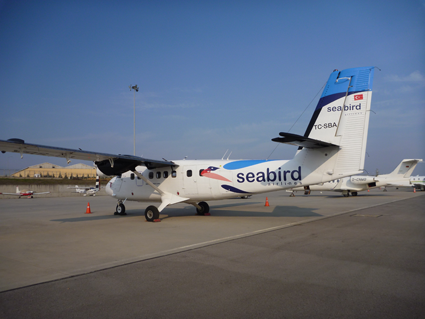
TC-SBA parked in İstanbul Sabiha Gökçen Airport

Seabird Airlines was an airline operating scheduled seaplane services in Istanbul, Turkey, and the surrounding area. Its main base was at Haliç on the Golden Horn. It was the only floatplane operator in Turkey. It also operated sightseeing flights over Istanbul.

== History ==
The airline was established in Istanbul in 2010 by Kürşad Arusan (chairman of the board) and the German Angel Investor Christian Theisen, although it took a further two years to get all the required certification from the Turkish aviation authorities. It is part of the Burulas Havacilik Group. It ceased operations in June 2015, citing financial difficulties, most likely driven by a drop in wealthy Russian tourists.

== Destinations ==
Its main route was between its base in Haliç to Gemlik. Other destinations were:

- Alaçatı
- Ayvalık
- Bodrum
- Bozcaada
- İzmit

== Fleet ==
The Seabird Airlines fleet consisted of four de Havilland Canada DHC-6 Twin Otter Series 300 aircraft in February 2015. All of the aircraft were leased from Kenn Borek Air in Canada. Two were returned to the lessor during the winter season 2014/15.
