= Harry Pidgeon =

Harry Clifford Pidgeon (August 31, 1869 – November 4, 1954) was an American sailor, a noted photographer, and was the second person to sail single-handedly around the world (1921–1925), 23 years after Joshua Slocum. Pidgeon was the first person to sail a yacht around the world via the Panama Canal and the Cape of Good Hope, the first person to solo-circumnavigate by way of the Panama Canal, and the first person to solo circumnavigate the world twice (the second time was 1932–1937). On both voyages, he sailed a 34-foot yawl named Islander, which Pidgeon built himself on a beach in Los Angeles. Prior to his first trip, Pidgeon had no sailing experience and was referred to in the press as the "Library Navigator". He accounts for his adventure in his book, Around the World Single-Handed: The Cruise of the "Islander" (1932).

== Biography ==
Harry Clifford Pidgeon was born 31 August 1869 on a farm in Iowa. His father, Isaac Marion Pidgeon, was married 3 times and had a total of 12 children. The family were Quakers. At the age of 15, he set out for California where he found work on a ranch. Before long, he traveled north to Alaska, where he took a raft down the Yukon River and spent some time sailing among the small islands of the southeastern Alaskan coast. Later, he returned to California and traveled and worked in the Sierra Nevada mountains, taking up a career in photography.

=== Islander ===
In 1917, Pidgeon started constructing the Islander in the Port of Los Angeles from plans he copied from Rudder magazine. The Islander cost $1,000 in materials and took a year and a half to build. Upon completion, he tested the yawl with trips to Catalina Island and then to Hawaii and back. Because all of his initial knowledge of seafaring and boatbuilding came from reading, he was dubbed the "Library Navigator" in the press.

=== Solo circumnavigations ===
After he gained confidence in his boat and his abilities, Pidgeon set out for the Marquesas Islands on November 18, 1921. This began his first four-year circumnavigation. His leisurely trip included stays in the Marquesas, Samoa, Fiji, New Hebrides, New Guinea, the Torres Strait, Christmas Island, the Cocos Islands, Mauritius, Cape Town, St. Helena, Ascension Island, Trinidad Island, Cristobal, the Panama Canal, and his return to Los Angeles on October 31, 1925. He published an account of the voyage in his 1932 book, Around the World Single-Handed.

In 1926 he was awarded the Blue Water Medal.

In 1932, Pidgeon embarked on another solo circumnavigation, this one lasting five years.

=== Later life and the demise of the Islander ===
He met his wife, Margaret Dexter Gardner, in Byram, Connecticut. They were married 6 May 1944. Of his marriage, Pidgeon said, "I have never been married, but now that I was 72 years old, I considered myself sufficiently ripe to give it a try." His wife was the daughter of an oceangoing sea captain and was born aboard the "J.H. Dexter".

In 1947, he and Margaret and one crewman set out for yet another circumnavigation. On this trip, on January 23, 1948, the Islander was damaged by rough weather and then broken up on some rocks in Hog Harbour on the island of Espiritu Santo in the New Hebrides Islands. Only some navigation equipment and the sails were salvageable.

Pidgeon died of pneumonia on November 4, 1954, at the age of 85 at the San Pedro Community Hospital in San Pedro, California.

== Photography ==
Pidgeon's photographs are highly valued for their ethnographic significance. He left over 1,500 negatives of his trips with the Mohle family (Commander Robert Mohle of Manhattan Beach, CA). These are now in the collection of the California Museum of Photography at the University of California, Riverside.

There is also a collection of his work from the Sierras, documenting the everyday life in the logging community, at the California State University, Fresno.

Another small collection, including glass plate negatives of both Pidgeon's time in Yosemite's Sugar Pine logging camps and his circumnavigation along with maps, books and other artifacts Pidgeon collected during his travels has remained in the family, and now belongs to Mr. Michael McKinney, Pidgeon's great-great-nephew.

== Legacy ==
Pidgeon donated items from his voyages to the Cabrillo Museum in Los Angeles.

Pidgeon was somewhat unusual in that his trips were not done as tests of his bravery, publicity stunts, or any reason other than interest in seeing the world. Moreover, Pidgeon had no previous experience with ocean navigation, boat-building, or long-distance sailing.

At the end of his book he wrote: "My voyage was not undertaken for the joy of sailing alone. It was my way of seeing some interesting parts of the world....Just the same, any landsman who builds his own vessel and sails it alone around the world will certainly meet with some adventures, so I shall offer no apology for my own voyage. Those days were the freest and happiest of my life."

== Book ==
- Around the World Single-Handed: The Cruise of the "Islander" ISBN 978-0-486-25946-8
