= Moncrabeau =

- Commune
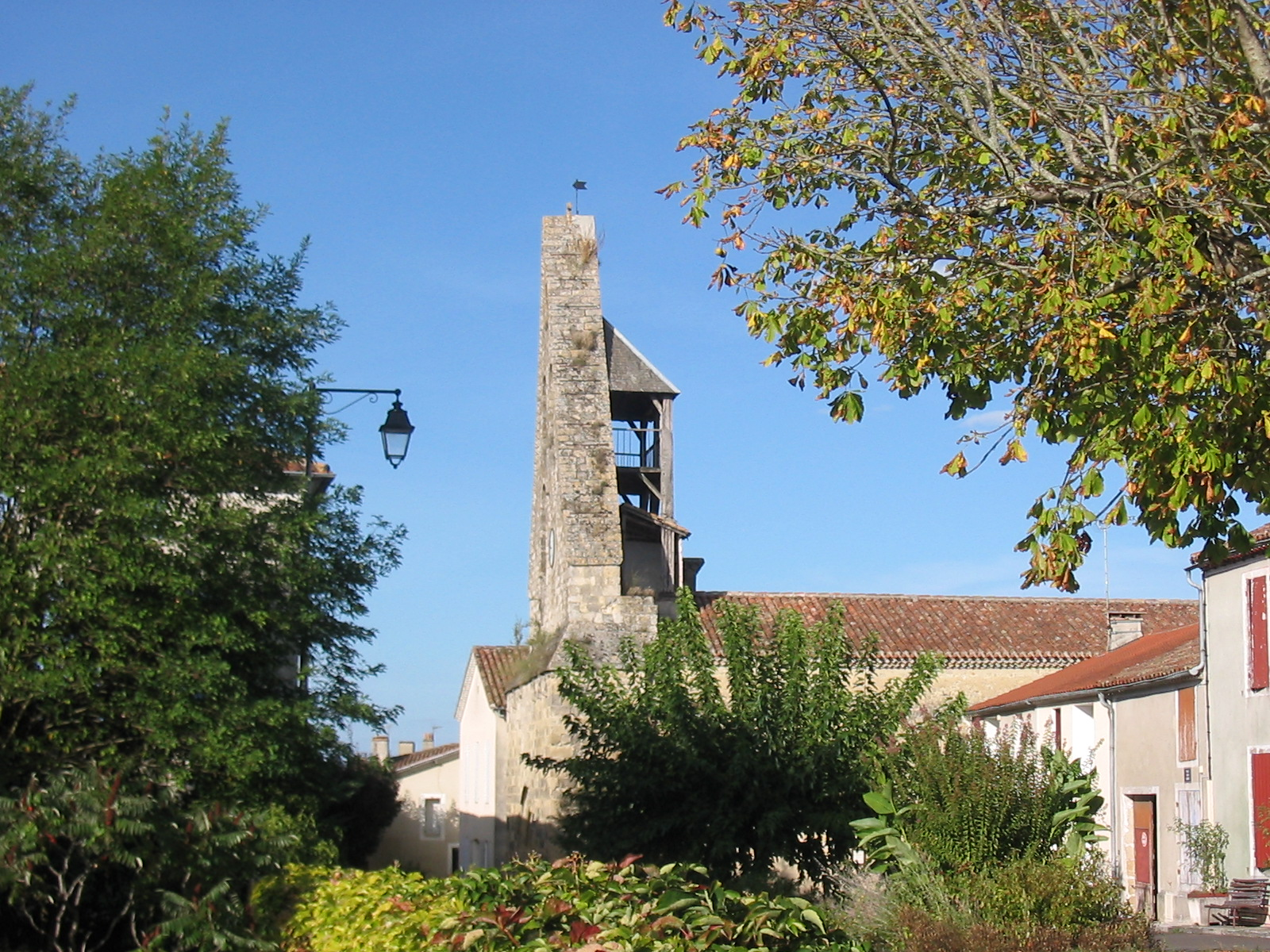
- The church in Moncrabeau

- Coat of arms
- Location of Moncrabeau
- Location within France Location within Nouvelle-Aquitaine
- Coordinates: 44°02′05″N 0°22′18″E
- Country: France
- Region: Nouvelle-Aquitaine
- Department: Lot-et-Garonne
- Arrondissement: Nérac
- Canton: L'Albret
- Intercommunality: Albret Communauté

Government
  - Mayor (2020–2026): Nicolas Choisnel
- Area^{1}: 49.94 km^{2} (19.28 sq mi)
- Elevation: 72 m (236 ft)
- Highest elevation: 185 m (607 ft)
- Lowest elevation: 52 m (171 ft)
- Population (2023): 745
  - Density: 14.9/km^{2} (38.6/sq mi)
- Time zone: UTC+01:00 (CET)
  - Summer (DST): UTC+02:00 (CEST)
- INSEE/Postal code: 47174 /47600
- ^{1} French Land Register data, which excludes lakes, ponds, glaciers > 1 km^{2} (0.386 sq mi or 247 acres) and river estuaries.

Moncrabeau (French pronunciation: [mɔ̃kʁabo]; Occitan: Montcrabèu) is a commune in the Lot-et-Garonne department in south-western France.

Moncrabeau is located on the Petite Baïse river, close to the D930.

== See also ==
- Communes of the Lot-et-Garonne department
