= Sea Bird (ship) =

Merchant brig under the command of John Huxham

John Huxham
- Died: 1750–1760; At sea (presumed)
- Occupation: Merchant
- Known for: Mysterious disappearance
- Partner: Wife

The SV Sea Bird or Seabird (later renamed Beach Bird) was a merchant brig under the command of John Huxham (or Husham or Durham). In 1750 or 1760 the ship grounded herself at Easton's Beach, Rhode Island.

== Disappearance ==
Her longboat was missing, and she had been returning from a voyage to Honduras and was expected in Newport that day. The ship was apparently abandoned in sight of land (coffee was boiling on the galley stove) and drifted off course. The only living things found on the ship were a dog and a cat. The vessel was eventually sold to a merchant of Newport, who changed her name to the Beach Bird, in which name she made many voyages.

== Aftermath ==
A fictional account of how she became derelict appeared in the Wilmington, Delaware, Sunday Morning Star for October 11, 1885. There are so many variations of this story that have often been retold, that many consider this story to be nothing more than a myth.

== See also ==
- List of missing ships
- List of people who disappeared mysteriously at sea
