= Larisa (Troad) =

Ancient Greek city in Anatolia

- Λάρισα (Ancient Greek)
- Location within Turkey
- 39°36′55″N 26°8′43″E
- Type: Settlement
- Periods: Early Bronze Age to Hellenistic period
- Location: Babadere, Çanakkale Province, Turkey
- Region: Troad

Larissa (Ancient Greek: Λάρισσα, romanized: Larissa), was an ancient Greek city in the south-west of the Troad region of Anatolia. Its surrounding territory was known in Greek as the Λαρισσαῖα (Larissaia). It has been located on a small rise by the coast now known as Limantepe, about 3.5 km from the village of Kösedere to the north-east and 3 km from the village of Babadere to the east, in the Ayvacık district of Çanakkale province, Turkey. As with other Greek toponyms containing the consonantal string -ss-, spellings that drop one 's' exist alongside those that retain both in the ancient literary sources. Larisa in the Troad should not be confused with 'Aeolian' Larissa, near Menemen, or with 'Ionian' Larissa in İzmir province.

== History ==
=== Early Bronze Age ===
Ceramic finds of Early Bronze Age III (c. 2700 - c. 2200 BC) and Troy VI material suggest that Limantepe had been occupied since the mid-3rd millennium BC by a pre-Greek population.

=== Late Bronze Age ===
The Augustan geographer Strabo considered the toponym 'Laris(s)a' to be Pelasgian, and it was understood by lexicographers in Antiquity to mean 'citadel'. The specific attribution to the little understood Pelasgians should be treated with caution, as scholars now generally consider this a catch-all term used by Greeks to refer to the non-Greek peoples whom they knew had previously inhabited Asia Minor, but understood little about. Nevertheless, modern philologists do consider the consonantal string -ss- to be pre-Greek, and possibly Luwian, in origin, and so it is quite possible that the name Larisa represents a pre-Greek survival.

Larisa in Troad was likely the Larisa mentioned by Homer in his catalogue of Troy's allies in the Iliad. Some early historians located it in Thrace, but Geoffrey Kirk has shown that they were confused by a mistake of Strabo, and that the site of Larisa in Troad fits well with the other mentions of the Pelasgians in the Iliad.

=== Iron Age ===
We hear nothing about Larisa in the Archaic Greek period from our literary sources, but ceramic finds at Limantepe indicate Greek occupation from the late 8th century BC.

=== Classical Age ===
In 427 BC Larisa was one of the so-called Actaean cities that Athens took from Mytilene following the end of the Mytilenean revolt, and it appears in the Athenian tribute assessments in 425/424 BC and 422/421 BC. In 425/424 BC it had an assessment of 3 talents, a relatively high figure compared to other cities in the Troad. As a former member of the Mytilenaean peraia, it is thought that the Greeks who originally settled Larisa were from Mytilene, as was the case with the other Actaean cities. A corrupt passage of Strabo used to be understood as instead supporting the idea that Larisa and its neighbour to the north Kolonai belonged to the peraia of the island of Tenedos, but scholars now prefer to restore Lesbos in the lacuna. Larisa was forcibly re-incorporated into the Persian Empire in 399 BC before being freed once more by the Spartan Dercylidas in 398 BC.

The relatively high Athenian tribute assessment for Larisa of 3 talents suggests that during the Classical period it was a comparatively wealthy settlement. It lay in a large fertile plain between the Acheloos river to the north and the Satnioeis river to the south that would have provided good farmland. In addition, it had access in Classical Antiquity to an excellent harbour. Its border to the south with Hamaxitus was marked by the Satnioeis river (modern Tuzla Çay), and for a period in the late 4th century BC it may have controlled the lucrative salt pans at Tragasai, which, though north of the Satnioeis, were in general controlled by Hamaxitus. Beyond the Acheloos lay the territory of Kolonai, which appears to have been in some sort of semi-dependent relationship with Larisa, further increasing the city's revenues.

The history of Larisa in the Hellenistic period is extremely obscure. It has generally been thought that Larisa lost its political independence in a synoecism with Antigoneia Troas c. 310 BC. However, the eminent French epigrapher Louis Robert consistently challenged this view, arguing that Larisa and Hamaxitus remained independent until after the Treaty of Apamea. Moreover, he proposed on the basis of a legend on a coin found at Limantepe (the site of Larisa) that for a period in the 3rd century BC Larisa was refounded by the Ptolemaic dynasty as Ptolemais. This theory has by no means won universal favour, and at present there is too little archaeological or numismatic evidence to decide the matter. Whether or not Larisa was still a polis at the time, the Delphic thearodokoi stopped off there c. 230 - 220 BC, indicating that there was still a settlement of some description on the site at this point. However, by the beginning of the Roman period Larisa appears to have been abandoned altogether.

== See also ==
- List of ancient Greek cities

== Bibliography ==
=== Ancient sources ===
- Athenaeus, Deipnosophistae.
- Homer, Iliad.
- Pliny the Elder, Naturalis Historia.
- Strabo, Geographica.
- Xenophon, Hellenica.

=== Modern sources ===
- J. Murray, A Classical Manual: Being a Mythological, Historical, and Geographical Commentary on Pope's Homer and Dryden's Aeneid of Virgil, London (1833).
- L. Bürchner, Realencyclopädie der classischen Altertumswissenschaft, vol. XII (1925) s.v. Λάρισα (7), col. 871.
- A. Plassart, "Inscriptions de Delphes: la liste de théorodoques", Bulletin de Correspondance Hellénique, 45 (1921) pp. 1–85.
- L. Robert, "Villes de Carie et d'Ionie dans la liste des théorodoques de Delphes", Bulletin de Correspondance Hellénique, 70 (1946) pp. 506–523.
- L. Robert, Études de Numismatique Grecque (Paris, 1951).
- J. M. Cook, The Troad: An Archaeological and Topographical Study (Oxford, 1973) pp. 218–221.
- L. Robert, "Documents d'Asie Mineure", Bulletin de Correspondance Hellénique, 106.1 (1982) pp. 319–333.
- G. S. Kirk, The Iliad: A Commentary, Cambridge University Press (1985–1993).
- J. M. Cook, "Cities in and around the Troad", Annual of the British School at Athens, 83 (1988) pp. 7–19.
- A. G. Akalın, 'Larisa und der Liman-Tepe in der Troas' in Studien zum antiken Kleinasien. Band III (Bonn, 1991) pp. 63–68.
- C. Carusi, Isole e Peree in Asia Minore (Pisa, 2003) pp. 35–37.
- S. Mitchell, "Larisa" in M.H. Hansen and T.H. Nielsen (eds.), An Inventory of Archaic and Classical Poleis (Oxford, 2004) no. 784.
- M. Finkelberg, Greeks and Pre-Greeks: Aegean Prehistory and Greek Heroic Tradition (Cambridge, 2005).
- A. Bresson, "Hamaxitos en Troade" in J. Dalaison (ed.), Espaces et pouvoirs dans l’Antiquité de l’Anatolie à la Gaule (Grenoble, 2007), pp. 139–158.
- S. Radt, Strabons Geographika: mit Übersetzung und Kommentar Vol. VII (Göttingen, 2008).
