= Mania (satrap) =

Persian governor (c.440 BC–c.399 BC)

Mania or Manya (Ancient Greek: Μανία; c. 440 BC – c. 399 BC), known primarily through Xenophon, was a Dardanian sub-satrap as the tyrant ruler of ancient Dardanus in Asia Minor.

She was the wife of Zenis, sub-satrap under the Persian satrap Pharnabazus II, and became sub-satrap herself after her husband's death.

Her husband Zenis ruled Dardanus as tyrant with the support of the Persian satrap. When he died, she succeeded him as a tyrant ruler. It was unusual for a woman to succeed as a tyrant in a Greek city state. Like Zenis, she also needed the support of Pharnabazus II to secure her rule. According to Xenophon, she gave many gifts to Pharnabazus II and the influential members of his court when she successfully applied for his support in her succession.

As a ruler, Mania was known for her loyalty as a sub-satrap. She fulfilled her duties as sub-satrap by paying her tributes as well as assisting Pharnabazus II's military with her army of mercenaries. She participated in campaigns against the rebellious Mysians and Pisidians, and secured Persian rule in the cities of Larisa (Troad), Hamaxitos and Kolonai. She attended the battles of her mercenaries in a carriage or chariot, and was never defeated. Polyaenus, following Xenophon, describes her as an excellent general.

Mania was described with admiration by contemporary male Greek chronicles. Her relationship with Pharnabazus II was very good, and Xenophon writes that he asked for her opinion on political issues.

She, as well as her seventeen-year-old son, were both murdered by her son-in-law Meidias. Pharnabazus II refused to support Meidias as her successor, and the citizens were reportedly unwilling to accept him as such. Shortly after the murder, the city surrendered to the Spartan general Dercylidas.
