= Cocylium =

Town of the ancient Troad

Coordinates: 39°40′22″N 26°24′37″E

Cocylium or Kokylion (Ancient Greek: Κοκύλιον) was a town of the ancient Troad or of Mysia. Xenophon mentions it indirectly by pointing out that the inhabitants of Cocylium (Κοκυλίτης), together with those of Ilium and Neandria, declared themselves independent and allied with the Spartan Dercylidas when he went to Aeolia with an army to try to liberate the Greek colonies from Persian rule. Pliny the Elder notes Cocylium among the cities that, in his time, had disappeared from the Troad.

Its site is tentatively located near Karaev, Çanakkale Province, Turkey.
