= Neandreia =

Neandreia (Νεάνδρεια) Ancient city in the Troad (Turkey)
- Polis
- Location within Turkey
- Coordinates: 39°43′03″N 26°17′04″E

Neandreia (Ancient Greek: Νεάνδρεια), Neandrium or Neandrion (Νεάνδριον), also known as Neandrus or Neandros (Νέανδρος), was a Greek city in the south-west of the Troad region of Anatolia. Its site has been located on Çığrı Dağ, about 9 km east of the remains of the ancient city of Alexandria Troas in the Ezine district of Çanakkale province, Turkey (based on the work of John Manuel Cook). The site was first identified as Neandreia by Frank Calvert in 1865 and Joseph Thacher Clarke in 1886 and was first excavated by the German architect Robert Koldewey when he excavated in 1889.

Suda and Stephanus of Byzantium writes that some erroneously called it with "L" instead of "N" as Leandreia (Λεάνδρεια) and Leandros (Λέανδρος).

== History ==
We do not know the circumstances of Neandreia's foundation in the Archaic period. The author of the 4th century AD work Dictys Cretensis Ephemeridos belli Trojani claimed that Neandreia had been the home of the legendary king Cycnus who was killed on the first day of the Trojan War by Achilles and his city sacked. However, there is no archaeological evidence for settlement in the second millennium BC on Çığrı Dağ and Cycnus is likewise claimed by the neighbouring cities of Kolonai and Tenedos. The first settlers of Neandreia probably chose the site because it is highly defensible and commands impressive views over travel along two axes: north-south along the western coast of the Troad, and east-west from the coast into the middle Skamander valley. Çığrı Dağ, the granite mountain on which Neandreia is located, has a maximum height of 520 m and a circuit 1,400 m and up to 450 m wide. It has access to granite quarries which were used for its fortification and to springs which would help the inhabitants withstand sieges. The city's main area of agricultural cultivation was the Plain of Samonion, provisionally identified with an area in the middle Skamander valley to the east of Neandreia.

The earliest archaeological remains found on Çığrı Dağ date to the 6th century BC. These include a temple, an agora, and a stoa, as well as fortifications at the western end of the site. It has been suggested that this temple was dedicated to Apollo, since Apollo appears on the coins of the city and an inscription from Neandreia dating to ca. 500 BC records the dedication of a statue to this god. Rock-cut inscriptions found 1 km from the city's main gate and tentatively dated to the Classical period attest the existence of a sacred grove for Zeus, while other inscriptions found near Çığrı Dağ indicate the existence of a temple of Dionysus in the city's territory. In the Periplus of Pseudo-Scylax, which dates to the mid-4th century BC, Neandreia is said to be ethnically Aeolian in origin, and this is confirmed by inscriptions dating to the 6th century BC in the Aeolian dialect. The language of a dedication to the god Priapus indicates that by the late 5th or early 4th century BC the Aeolic dialect was no longer spoken at Neandreia.

In the 5th century BC Neandreia was a member of the Delian League and is recorded paying a tribute to Athens of 2,000 drachmas as part of the Hellespontine district from 454/3 to 410/9 BC. Soon after this latter date, perhaps following the defeat of Athens in the Peloponnesian War in 404, the city of Neandreia came under the influence of Zenis, the dynast of Dardanus, who controlled the Troad on behalf of the Persian satrap Pharnabazos. Under Zenis and his wife and successor Mania, a garrison of Greek troops was installed in Neandreia. In 399 BC, this garrison was expelled and the city freed by the Spartan commander Dercylidas. Archaeological investigations have shown that in the late 5th or early 4th century BC a new circuit of walls was constructed from granite ashlar blocks which was 3.2 km in length, 2.9 m thick, and enclosed an area of 40 ha. It is not clear whether these walls were constructed when the city was in the hands of Zenis and Mania, or after Dercylidas had freed the city. Later in the 4th century BC there was further construction work on Çığrı Dağ, including housing in its western part on a rectangular grid, a complex internal drainage system, and possibly a theatre. The excavators estimate that in this period the city consisted of 230 houses and a population of about 2,500 individuals.

In ca. 310 BC, Antigonus I Monophthalmus founded the city of Antigonia Troas (after 301 BC renamed Alexandria Troas) as a synoecism of the surrounding cities of the Troad, including Neandreia. The earliest coinage of the newly synoecized city adopted the coin types of Neandreia, which displayed a grazing horse, and this remained Alexandria Troas' emblem on its coinage for the rest of antiquity. From this point on, Neandreia had no independent political existence, hence in the 1st century AD Pliny the Elder listed it among the settlements in the Troad which no longer existed in his day. However, a sarcophagus found near Çığrı Dağ which dates to the Roman period and held the remains of two men named Neandros and Epitynchanon indicates that the area was still inhabited long afterwards, presumably as a deme of Alexandria Troas.

== Bibliography ==
- R. Koldewey, Neandria (Berlin, 1891).
- J. M. Cook, The Troad: An Archaeological and Topographical Study (Oxford, 1973) 204-8.
- T. Maischatz, 'Untersuchungen zu einer Stadterweiterungsphase im 4. Jh. v. Chr.' in Schwertheim (1994) 49–64.
- A. Schulz, 'Zur jüngeren Stadtmauer' in Schwertheim (1994) 65–89.
- E. Schwertheim (ed.), Neue Forschungen zu Neandria und Alexandria Troas, I, Asia Minor Studien 11 (Bonn, 1994).
- E. Schwertheim, 'Geschichte und Forschungsstand' in Schwertheim (1994) 21-37.
- M. Trunk, 'Das Theater von Neandria? Vorbericht zu einer Stufenanlage im Stadtzentrum' in Schwertheim (1994) 91–100.
- H. Wiegartz, 'Äolische Kapitelle: Neufunde und ihr Verhältnis zu den bekannten Stücken' in Schwertheim (1994) 117–32.
- M. Ricl, The Inscriptions of Alexandria Troas, Inschriften griechischer Städte aus Kleinasien 53 (Bonn, 1997).
- A. Schulz, Die Stadtmauern von Neandreia in der Troas, Asia Minor Studien 38 (Bonn, 2000).
- S. Mitchell, 'Neandreia' in M. H. Hansen and T. H. Nielsen (eds.), An Inventory of Archaic and Classical Poleis (Oxford, 2004) no. 785.
- A. Meadows, 'The earliest coinage of Alexandria Troas' Numismatic Chronicle 164 (2004) 47-70.
