= Proclia =

In Greek mythology, Proclia or Proclea (Ancient Greek: Πρόκλεια, romanized: Prókleia) is the daughter of Laomedon, king of Troy, or Clytius, son of Laomedon (and in the latter case sister of Caletor). She married Cycnus, king of Colonae, and bore him two children, Tenes and Hemithea. Tenes, however is said to be the son of Apollo.
