= Neandrus =

Neandrus or Neandros (Ancient Greek: Νέανδρος) can refer to:

- Neandreia or Neandrus, a Greek city in the Troad region of Asia Minor
- Neandrus (mythology), a man in Greek mythology
