= Philonome (daughter of Tragasus) =

Mythological queen of Troad

In Greek mythology, Philonome (Ancient Greek: Φιλονόμη, romanized: Philonómē, lit. 'pasture-loving') or Phylonome is the daughter of Tragasus and second wife of king Cycnus, thus stepmother to his children Tenes and Hemithea. She features in a short myth where she falsely accuses her stepson of rape to his father after failing to seduce him herself. Philonome's myth is a typical example of the "Potiphar's wife", a common motif in mythology and folklore.

== Family ==
Philonome was the daughter of Tragasus via an unnamed mother. In some authors she is also called Polyboea or Scamandria.

== Mythology ==
Philonome was the second wife of king Cycnus of Colonae, a city in the Troad region of northwestern Asia Minor. Through her marriage she became stepmother to Cycnus' two children by his previous marriage, Tenes and Hemithea. Philonome desired her stepson Tenes romantically and tried to seduce him, only for her efforts to fail. In revenge she falsely accused Tenes of attempting (or even managing) to violate her, and brought the flute-player Eumolpus or Molpus as her false witness.

Cycnus believed her tale at first, so he locked up Tenes and Hemithea into a chest he set adrift into the sea, until the chest washed up on shores of Tenedos, an island opposite of Troad. However the falsehood did not last forever and Cycnus eventually learnt the truth, so he stoned Eumolpus to death and buried Philonome alive into the ground.

== Symbolism ==
The myth of Philonome and Tenes is one of several examples of the popular 'Potiphar's wife' motif commonly found in Greek mythology and other folklore in which a woman, usually an already married one, tries and fails to seduce a man and then attempts to accuse him of rape. The most known case of that in Greek myth is Hippolytus and Phaedra, the son and wife of the Athenian hero Theseus, though other notable examples include Eunostus and Ochne, or Antheus and Cleoboea. A lot of time those false accusations come from a place of hurt pride, though also commonly fear of being reported to their husbands or other male relatives.

Several authors mention Philonome's tale starting with a fragment from a mostly lost fifth-century BC tragedy Tennes, dubiously attributed to Euripides, which informs us that Cycnus killed his wife after he discovered her treachery, and Lycophron in the fourth century BC. The detail of the flute-player that supports the queen's sladers is an old but not consistent element, whose tale was used to explain the exclusion of flute-players from the shrine of Tenes at Tenedos.

== See also ==
Other similar myths:

- Stheneboea
- Phthia
- Potiphar's wife

== Bibliography ==
- Apollodorus, The Library with an English Translation by Sir James George Frazer, F.B.A., F.R.S. in 2 Volumes, Cambridge, MA, Harvard University Press; London, William Heinemann Ltd. 1921. ISBN 0-674-99135-4. Online version at the Perseus Digital Library. Greek text available from the same website.
- Avery, Catherine B., ed. (1962). New Century Classical Handbook. New York, US: Appleton-Century-Crofts.
- Bell, Robert E. (1991). Women of Classical Mythology: A Biographical Dictionary. ABC-Clio. ISBN 9780874365818.
- Conon, Narrations, surviving as one-paragraph summaries in the Bibliotheca (Library) of Photius, Patriarch of Constantinople, translated from the Greek by Brady Kiesling. Online version at the Topos Text Project.
- Diodorus Siculus, Library of History, Volume III: Books 4.59-8, translated by C. H. Oldfather, Loeb Classical Library No. 340. Cambridge, Massachusetts, Harvard University Press, 1939. ISBN 978-0-674-99375-4. Online version by Bill Thayer.
- Euripides, Fragments: Oedipus-Chrysippus, Other Fragments. Edited and translated by Christopher Collard, Martin Cropp. Loeb Classical Library 506. Cambridge, MA: Harvard University Press, 2009. Online at Loeb Classical Library.
- Gantz, Timothy (1996). Early Greek Myth: A Guide to Literary and Artistic Sources. Vol. II. Johns Hopkins University Press. ISBN 978-0-8018-5362-3.
- Gordon, Richard L. (October 1, 2006). "Molpus". In Cancik, Hubert; Schneider, Helmuth (eds.). Brill's New Pauly. Translated by Christine F. Salazar. Ilmmünster: Brill Reference Online. ISSN 1574-9347.
- Grimal, Pierre (1987). The Dictionary of Classical Mythology. Wiley-Blackwell. ISBN 0-631-13209-0.
- Hard, Robin (2004). The Routledge Handbook of Greek Mythology: Based on H.J. Rose's "Handbook of Greek Mythology". Routledge. ISBN 9780415186360.
- Lycophron, Alexandra (or Cassandra) in Callimachus and Lycophron with an English translation by A. W. Mair ; Aratus, with an English translation by G. R. Mair, London: W. Heinemann, New York: G. P. Putnam 1921 . Internet Archive
- Pausanias, Description of Greece with an English Translation by W.H.S. Jones, Litt.D., and H.A. Ormerod, M.A., in 4 Volumes. Cambridge, MA, Harvard University Press; London, William Heinemann Ltd. 1918. ISBN 0-674-99328-4. Online version at the Perseus Digital Library
- Plutarch, Quaestiones Graecae in Moralia, with an English Translation by Frank Cole Babbitt. Cambridge, MA. Harvard University Press. London. William Heinemann Ltd. 1936. Online text available at Perseus.tufts Project.
- Rose, Herbert J. (2004). A Handbook of Greek Mythology (6th ed.). London, New York: Routledge. ISBN 0-415-04601-7.
- Trenkner, Sophie (1958). The Greek Novella in the Classical Period. Cambridge, UK: Cambridge University Press. ISBN 978-1-107-43825-5.
