= Tenes =

Greek mythological hero

In Greek mythology, Tenes or Tennes (Ancient Greek: Τέννης) was the eponymous hero of the island of Tenedos.

== Family ==
Tenes was the son either of Apollo or of King Cycnus of Colonae by Proclia, daughter or granddaughter of Laomedon.

== Mythology ==
Cycnus's second wife Philonome, daughter of Tragasus or Cragasus, falsely accused Tenes of rape, bringing in a flutist named Eumolpus as witness. Cycnus believed the accusations and tried to kill Tenes and his sister Hemithea by placing them both in a chest, which was set into the ocean. However, the chest landed at the island of Leucophrys, which was later renamed Tenedos, and the two survived. The natives of the island pronounced Tenes their king. Cycnus later learned the truth, killed Eumolpus, buried Philonome alive and tried to reconcile with his children, but Tenes rejected his overture: when Cycnus's ship landed at Tenedos, Tenes took an axe and cut the moorings.

Plutarch writes that the people of Tenedos prohibited both aulos-players from entering the sanctuary of Tenes and the mention of Achilles name within it because of events associated with Tenes. According to the tradition, an aulos-player named Molpus falsely testified that Tenes had attempted to seduce his stepmother, forcing Tenes to flee to Tenedos with his sister. Later, although Thetis had warned Achilles not to kill Tenes because he was especially honoured by Apollo, and had instructed one of his servants to remind him of this, Achilles unknowingly slew Tenes while he was defending his sister. Realizing his mistake only after Tenes had fallen, Achilles killed the servant who had failed to remind him of the warning and buried Tenes on the site where his sanctuary was later established. According to Tzetzes, this servant's name was Mnemon. Diodorus Siculus preserves a similar tradition, likewise explaining that aulos-players were excluded from Tenes sacred precinct because one had borne false witness against him, and that Achilles name was forbidden because he had slain Tenes. Unlike Plutarch, however, Diodorus relates that Tenes reached the island after his father cast him into the sea in a chest, having believed his wife's false accusations, and he omits Plutarch's account of Thetis warning to Achilles and the servant who failed to remind him. Pseudo-Apollodorus story combines elements found of both traditions. Like Diodorus, he recounts that Tenes and his sister were set adrift in a chest after Cycnus accepted his wife's false accusation, although he names the perjuring aulos-player Eumolpus rather than Molpus. Like Plutarch, he preserves Thetis' warning that Achilles must not kill Tenes, but explains that, should Achilles do so, he himself would later die at the hands of Apollo. Unlike Plutarch, however, Apollodorus omits the episode of the servant who failed to remind Achilles of the warning and was subsequently killed.

Shortly after the end of the Trojan War, Agamemnon permitted the Trojan prisoners of war to build a city north of Mycenae. The city was called Tenea after Tenes. A description on the history of Tenea was also given by Pausanias.

Greeks used the proverb "Tenedian human" (Ancient Greek: Τενέδιος ἄνθρωπος) in reference to those with frightening appearance, because when Tenes laid down laws in Tenedos he stipulated that a man with an axe should stand behind the judge and strike the man being convicted after he had spoken in vain.
