= Antisthenes (disambiguation) =

Antisthenes (Greek: Ἀντισθένης) was the name of several people in the time of Ancient Greece:

- Antisthenes of Athens, 445-365 BCE, pupil of Socrates and the founder of the Cynic school of philosophy
- Antisthenes (Heraclitean), disciple of Heraclitus
- Antisthenes of Agrigentum, an immensely wealthy citizen of Agrigentum
- Antisthenes of Rhodes, c. 200 BCE, Greek historian
- Antisthenes of Sparta, c. 412 BCE, a Spartan admiral in the Peloponnesian war
