= Tragasai =

Town of the ancient Troad

Coordinates: 39°33′59″N 26°10′21″E

Tragasai (Ancient Greek: Τραγασαί), was a town of the ancient Troad.

Its site is located near Tuzla, Asiatic Turkey.
