= Myricus =

Lost town

Myricus or Myrikous (Ancient Greek: Μυρικοῦς) was a town of the ancient Troad. Stephanus of Byzantium says it was opposite to Tenedos and Lesbos.

Its site is unlocated.
