= Ilieon Kome =

Town in ancient Troad

Coordinates: 39°56′57″N 26°20′38″E

Ilieon Kome was a town in ancient Troad, on Kallikolone mountain (modern Karatepe).

Its site is located on Karatepe, Asiatic Turkey.
