= Berithros =

Town in ancient troad

Berithros (Ancient Greek: Βήριθρος) was a town in ancient Troad mentioned by Stephanus of Byzantium.

Its site is unlocated.
