= Gülpınar, Ayvacık =

Village in Turkey

Gülpınar
- Village
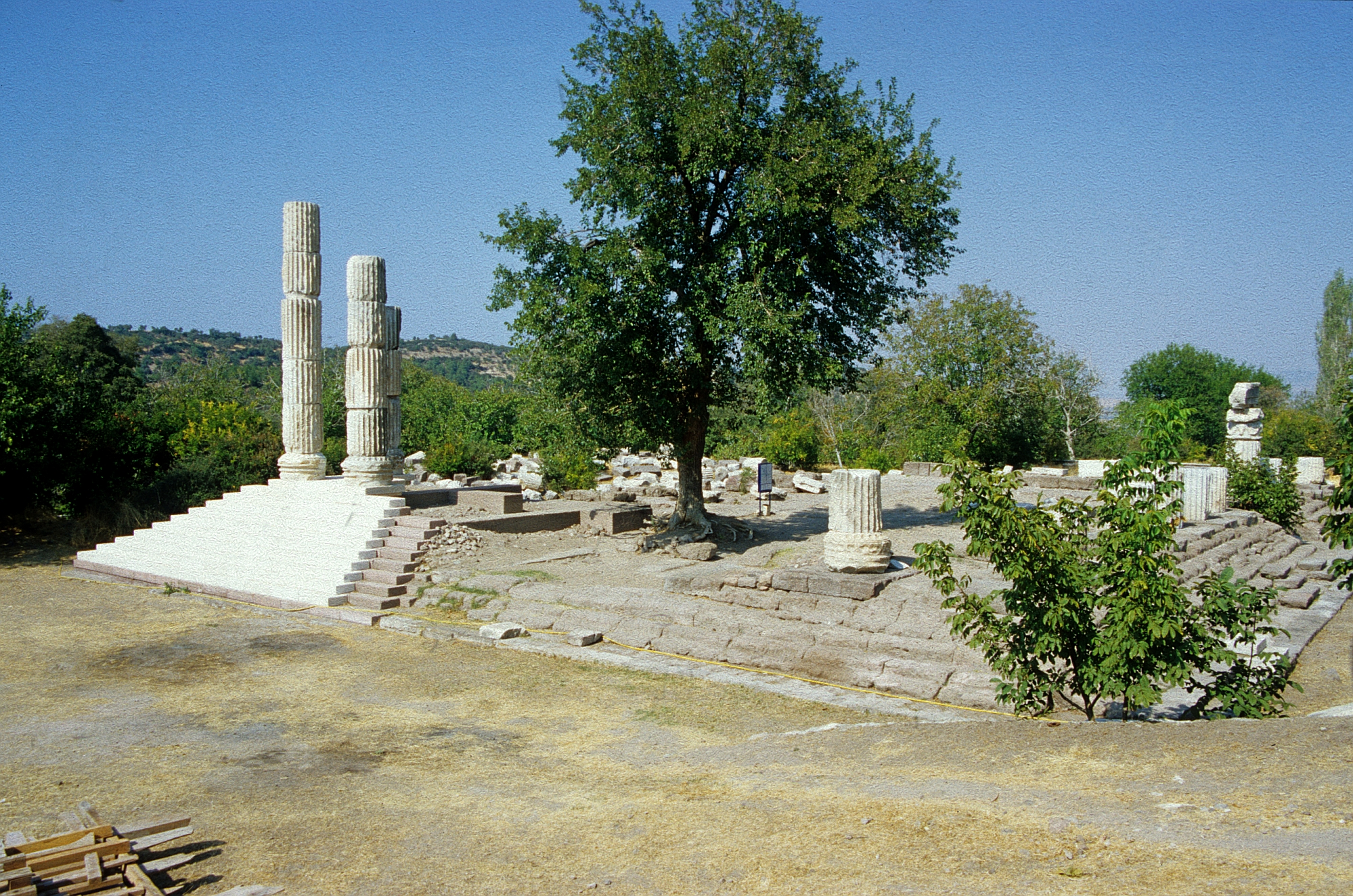

- Location within Turkey Location within Marmara
- Coordinates: 39°31′56″N 26°07′11″E
- Country: Turkey
- Province: Çanakkale
- District: Ayvacık
- Population (2022): 1,232
- Time zone: UTC+3 (TRT)

Gülpınar is a village in the Ayvacık District of Çanakkale Province in Turkey. Its population is 1,232 (2022).

The ruins of the ancient town of Hamaxitus with its Apollon Smintheion Sanctuary are within the village borders.

== History ==
The name of the village is referred to as Hamaksitós in the records of 454 and Külahlı in the records of 1912. The village has the same name since 1928.

Gülpınar, which became a township in 1951, became a municipality on November 2, 1991. The municipality status of the town ended at the 2013 reorganisation when its population fell below 2000 people. The hamlet of Kızılkeçili is part of Gülpınar.

== Geography ==
The village is 100 km from Çanakkale city center and 43 km from Ayvacık town centre.

== Population ==
Historical population
Year	Pop.	±% p.a.
1997	1,374	—
2007	1,238	−1.04%
2012	1,344	+1.66%
2017	1,319	−0.37%
2022	1,232	−1.36%
Source: 1997 census and TÜIK (2007-2022)
