= Kolonai =

Ancient Greek city of the Troad

- αἱ Κολωναί (Greek)
- Location within Turkey
- 39°41′23″N 26°9′48″E
- Location: Alemşah, Çanakkale Province, Turkey
- Region: Troad

History
- Built: 7th century BC

Kolonai (Ancient Greek: αἱ Κολωναί, romanized: hai Kolōnai; Latin: Colonae) was an ancient Greek city in the south-west of the Troad region of Anatolia. It has been located on a hill by the coast known as Beşiktepe ('cradle hill'), about equidistant between Larisa to the south and Alexandreia Troas to the north. It is 3.3 km east of the modern village of Alemşah in the Ezine district of Çanakkale Province, Turkey. Its name in Ancient Greek is the plural form of κολώνη (kolōnē), 'hill, mound', a common name for promontories with hills on them in the Eastern Mediterranean. It is not to be confused with Lampsacene Kolonai, a settlement situated in the hills above Lampsacus in the north-east of the Troad.

== History ==
Pottery finds suggest that Kolonai was inhabited in prehistoric times, but it is unknown whether there was any continuity between these period of its settlement and the Greek period. Greek ceramic material appears on the site from the 7th century BC, marking its foundation as a Greek settlement. At the period in which Daës of Kolonai was writing (probably the 4th century BC), the inhabitants of Kolonai thought they had been founded by Aeolian Greeks. Given that Lesbos was also ethnically Aeolian and Kolonai was one of the so-called Actaean cities which Athens took from Mytilene following the end of the Mytilenean revolt in 427 BC, it is likely that Mytilene founded Kolonai and subsequently controlled it. A corrupt passage of the geographer Strabo suggests instead that Kolonai belonged to the peraia of Tenedos, but there is now a consensus among consensus that the manuscripts should refer to it belonging to the peraia of Lesbos.

References to Kolonai in written sources from Classical Antiquity are extremely rare. The Spartan general Pausanias may have fled from Byzantium to Kolonai in 478 BC if it is this Kolonai rather than 'Lampsacene' Kolonai which is meant by Thucydides. Following the end of Mytilenaean control in 427 BC, it became part of the Delian League, and in 425/424 BC is recorded as paying a tribute of 1,000 drachmas, relatively small compared to the 3 talents which its neighbour Larisa paid in the same year.

In 399 BC, Kolonai was forcibly reincorporated into the Persian Empire by the local dynast Mania, but in the following year it was freed again by the Spartan general Dercyllidas. During the 4th century BC the city minted coins depicting a head of Athena on the obverse. Its relationship with neighbouring Larisa is unclear throughout the Classical period, but appears to be one of semi-dependence. In c. 310 BC Kolonai is thought to have been part of the synoecism with Antigoneia Troas, at which point the settlement is presumed to have been abandoned.

During his march through Asia Minor in 334 BC, Alexander the Great passed by Colonae after leaving the River Practius and continued to Hermotus.

== Daes of Kolonai ==
The obscure local historian Daes of Kolonai (Δάης ὁ Κολωναεύς) is the only literary figure from Kolonai who is known. As a writer of local history he can date no earlier than the late 5th century BC, and as a citizen of Kolonai he must date before c. 310 BC when Kolonai became synoecized with Alexandreia Troas; his floruit is therefore likely to have been in the 4th century BC. The Augustan geographer Strabo provides the only information on Daës in a brief quotation from his work on the history of Kolonai: "Daës of Kolonai says that the temple of Apollo Killaios was first founded in Kolonai by the Aeolians who sailed from Greece". The cult of Apollo Killaios was local to the southern Troad and Lesbos and is first mentioned in Homer's Iliad. The reference to the foundation of Kolonai by Aeolians indicates both that the inhabitants of Kolonai in the 4th century BC considered themselves to be ethnically Aeolian and that Daës' work dealt with the early history of his polis. The Aeolian identity of 4th-century BC Kolonai is independently confirmed by the legends on their coins which were spelt in the Aeolic Greek dialect.

== Cycnus ==
In Greek mythology, the king of Kolonai during the Trojan War was Cycnus. He was killed on the first day of the Trojan Wars by Achilles. This story does not appear in the Iliad, but does in the Cypria, which is thought to have been composed slightly later than the Iliad in the latter half of the 7th century BC. Cycnus appears on two separate occasions in Pindar, suggesting that by the early 5th century BC the myth had some currency. The mid-1st century BC historian Diodorus Siculus related a story about Cycnus which he attributed to the inhabitants of Tenedos, an island not far north of Kolonai, in which Cycnus' son Tennes founded Tenedos and gave it has name. A similar connection between the mythical king of Kolonai and the foundation of Tenedos was made two centuries later by the travel writer Pausanias.

== Bibliography ==
- E. Schwartz, RE IV (1901) s.v. Daës, col. 1982.
- L. Bürchner, RE XI (1922) s.v. αἱ Κολωναί (2), coll. 1100.
- J.M. Cook, The Troad (Oxford, 1973) 216–21.
- R. Hodot, Le dialecte éolien d'Asie: la langue des inscriptions, VIIe s. a.C.-IVe s. p.C. (Paris, 1990).
- S. Hornblower, A Commentary on Thucydides Vol. 1 (Oxford, 1991).
- C. Carusi, Isole e Peree in Asia Minore (Pisa, 2003) 35–7.
- S. Mitchell, 'Kolonai' in M.H. Hansen and T.H. Nielsen (eds.), An Inventory of Archaic and Classical Poleis (Oxford, 2004) no. 782.
- S. Radt, Strabons Geographika: mit Übersetzung und Kommentar Vol. VII (Göttingen, 2008).
