= Colonae (Hellespont) =

Ancient city of Mysia

Coordinates: 40°16′51″N 26°54′39″E

Colonae or Kolonai (Ancient Greek: Κολωναί) was a town in the ancient Troad near Lampsacus on the Hellespont. It was founded by the Milesians.

Its site is located about 2 miles (3.2 km) northwest of modern Beyçayırı, Turkey.
