= Antisthenes of Agrigentum =

Antisthenes (Ancient Greek: Ἀντισθένης) was a citizen of ancient Rome from Agrigentum. He was mentioned by Diodorus Siculus as an instance of the immense wealth which private citizens possessed at Agrigentum. When his daughter was married, more than 800 carriages went in the nuptial procession.
