= Tragasus =

In Greek mythology, Tragasus (Ancient Greek: Τράγασος) or Cragasus (Κράγασος) was the father of Philonome, the deceitful wife of Cycnus.

== Mythology ==
The name Tragasus may be connected with the Tragasaean salt-pan near Hamaxitus, mentioned by Strabo, which was located south of Troy. Stephanus of Byzantium mentions Tragasus as the eponym of Tragasae in Troad, and adds that Poseidon was believed to once have done him a favor by turning the sea water into solid matter. The connection between him and the placename is also confirmed in the Etymologicum Magnum.
