= Hamaxitus =

Former populated place in Turkey

- Ἁμαξιτός (Ancient Greek)
- Location within Turkey
- 39°32′18″N 26°5′35″E
- Type: Settlement
- Location: Gülpınar, Çanakkale Province, Turkey
- Region: Troad

History
- Built: Possibly during the 8th or 7th centuries BC
- Built by: Colonists from Mytilene
- Abandoned: Possibly after the 7th or 8th century AD

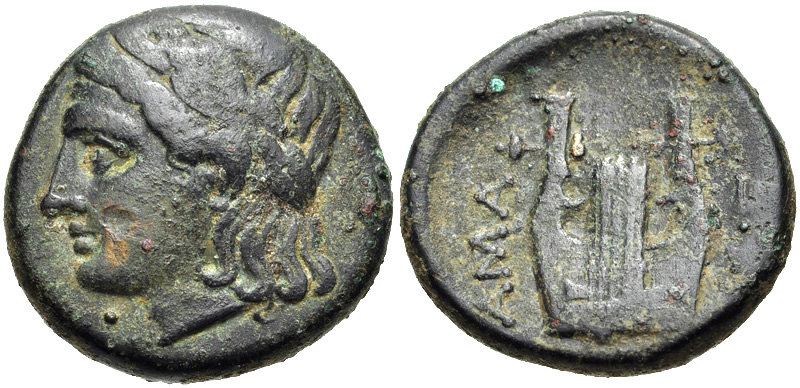
Bronze coin from Hamaxitos, 4th century BC. Obv: Laureate head of Apollo. Rev: Lyre, inscription ΑΜΑ[ΞΙΤΟΣ].

Hamaxitus (Ancient Greek: Ἁμαξιτός, romanized: Hamaxitos) was an ancient Greek city in the south-west of the Troad region of Anatolia which was considered to mark the boundary between the Troad and Aeolis. Its surrounding territory was known in Greek as Ἁμαξιτία (Hamaxitia), and included the temple of Apollo Smintheus, the salt pans at Tragasai, and the Satnioeis river (modern Tuzla Çay). It was probably an Aeolian colony. It has been located on a rise called Beşiktepe near the village of Gülpınar (previously Külahlı) in the Ayvacık district of Çanakkale Province, Turkey.

== Name ==
Hamaxitus first appears in the Athenian tribute lists in the 425/4 BC as hαμαχσιτός [hamakʰsiˈtos]. However, this spelling reflects the influence of Attic Greek and is not a reliable guide to how Hamaxitans would have spelt or pronounced the name of their city. Hamaxitus was located in an Aeolic-speaking area: Aeolic, like other so-called East Greek dialects, was psilotic and so, unlike Attic Greek, had lost the phoneme /h/. This retained /h/ is seen in the Attic spelling of Hamaxitus with an eta, which in Attic unlike other dialects represented [h] rather than [ɛː]. Likewise, the use of the digraph -χσ- (/k^{h}s/) for -ξ- (/x/) reflects Attic, not Aeolic usage. The grapheme ξ (xi) originally represented /ks/ (κσ); it was a peculiarity of Attic (consistent with not being psilotic and therefore retaining audibly aspirated consonants) that /ks/ was pronounced /k^{h}s/ and so represented by the grapheme χσ, as here in hαμαχσιτός. All other literary and epigraphic sources refer to Ἁμαξιτός and legends on the city's own coinage from the 4th century BC read ΑΜΑΞΙ (AMAXI, i.e. Ἁμαξι(τός), Hamaxi(tos)). The city's name derives from ἅμαξα (hamaxa) meaning 'wagon', hence the adjective ἁμαξιτός (hamaxitos), 'traversed by wagons', 'carriage-road', 'high-road'. Remains of an ancient road have been identified leading away up the coast from the sheltered bay immediately below the rise on which the Classical city was located at Beşiktepe, indicating the name's origin.

== Apollo Smintheus ==
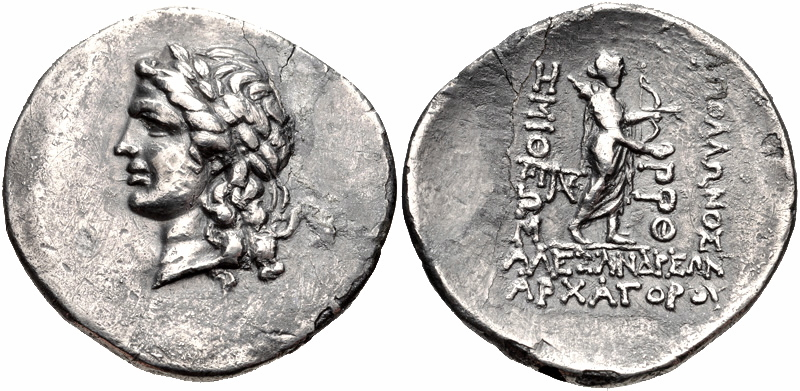
Silver didrachm of Alexandreia Troas showing on the reverse Apollo Smintheus standing right, quiver over shoulder, holding bow, arrow, and patera; inscription ΑΠΟΛΛΩΝΟΣ ΖΜΙΘΕΩΣ vertically.

All foundation myths about Hamaxitus in Classical Antiquity were related to the foundation of the nearby temple of Apollo Smintheus (Ἀπόλλων Σμινθεύς). The subject attracted much interest in Antiquity because in the opening of Homer's Iliad the Trojan priest of Apollo, Chryses, addresses the god in the vocative as Σμινθεῦ (Smintheu, 'O, Sminthian') when imploring him to send a plague against the Greeks because Agamemnon had seized his daughter Chryseis and refused to ransom her. The epithet Σμίνθος (Sminthos) caused some confusion to Greek speakers since they did not recognize it as being Greek in origin, and attributed it to the Pelasgian or Mysian languages. The consonantal string -nth- (also found in place names such as Corinth) is considered by philologists to be non-Greek, and possibly Luwian, in origin. The passage of Homer gives no indication as to its meaning, and so myths about Apollo Smintheus primarily arose from attempts to aetiologize the epithet.

The earliest tradition comes from Callinus, an elegiac poet from Ephesus who lived in the mid-7th century BC. He relates that Hamaxitus was founded by a band of Teucrian (i.e. Trojan) Cretans who were told by an oracle to found a city wherever the 'earth-born' (γηγενεῖς) attacked them. When they reached the area of Hamaxitus, a great horde of field mice ate all the leather on their equipment, and so they settled on the spot, interpreting the 'earth-born' of the oracle to have been the mice. This myth thus glosses the term sminthos as 'mouse'. Callinus' aetiology takes into account both Apollo's role as a god of disease and the fact that it was in precisely this role that Chryses had invoked him as 'Sminthian' in the Iliad. However, in discussing the cult, the Augustan Greek geographer Strabo of Amaseia noted that the epithets of gods worshipped at several other Greek sanctuaries were also explained by reference to a god bringing an end to a plague of small animals, and so it is not clear how Callinus arrived at this specific explanation of sminthos as 'mouse'. The term appears again as a poetic word for mice several centuries later in a fragment of the early 5th century BC tragedian Aeschylus, indicating that by this time Callinus' aetiology of 'Sminthian' had been generalized from an explanation of a particular epithet into an independent lexeme.

Callinus' version predominated in Classical Antiquity and is reflected in the local traditions of Hamaxitus. Coins minted by the city in the 4th and 3rd centuries BC feature Apollo Smintheus, and after Hamaxitus was synoecized, coins depicting Apollo Smintheus continued to be produced by the mint of Alexandreia Troas until the reign of the Emperor Gallienus (AD 260–268). In the early 1st century AD, Strabo described the sanctuary of Apollo Smintheus as having a statue of Apollo with his foot on a mouse created by the sculptor Scopas of Paros (c. 395 – c. 350 BC), while the Roman scholar Aelian (c. AD 175 – c. 235) related that mice were kept at public expense in the sanctuary and nested beneath the altar. The extensive remains of the Hellenistic temple can now be seen on the northern outskirts of the modern village of Gülpınar. The most recent Turkish excavations indicate that the Hellenistic temple was constructed c. 150–125 BC, and therefore at about the same time that the main festival of Alexandreia Troas changed from being the Πύθια ἐν Τρωάδι (Pythia en Troadi, 'the Pythia in the Troad') to the Σμίνθια (Sminthia, 'the Sminthia'). The cult spread to the island of Rhodes, where a month was named Σμίνθιος (Sminthios) and a festival known as the Sminthia was held which the scholar Philomnestus discussed in On the Sminthia at Rhodes.

== Gallery ==
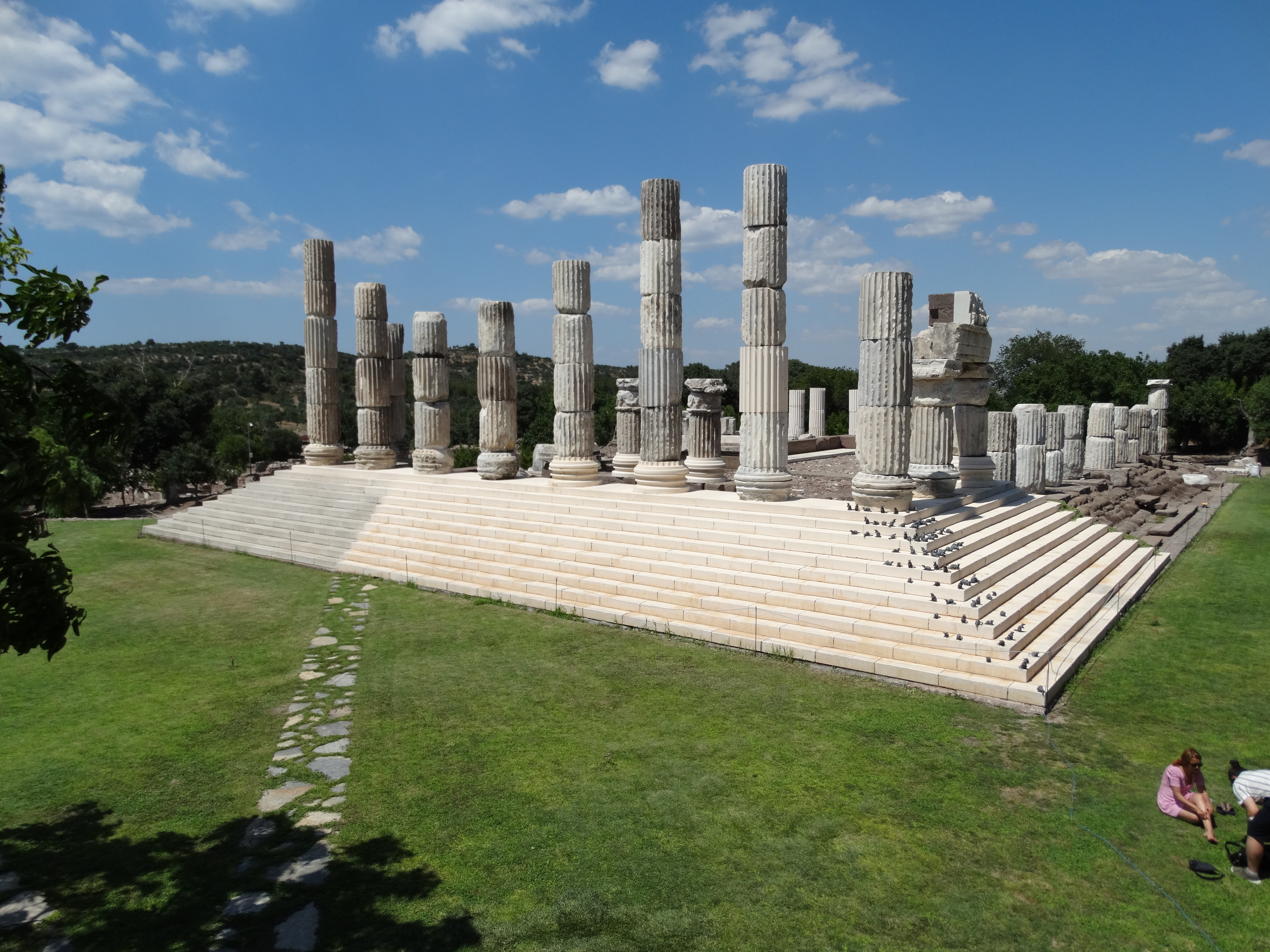

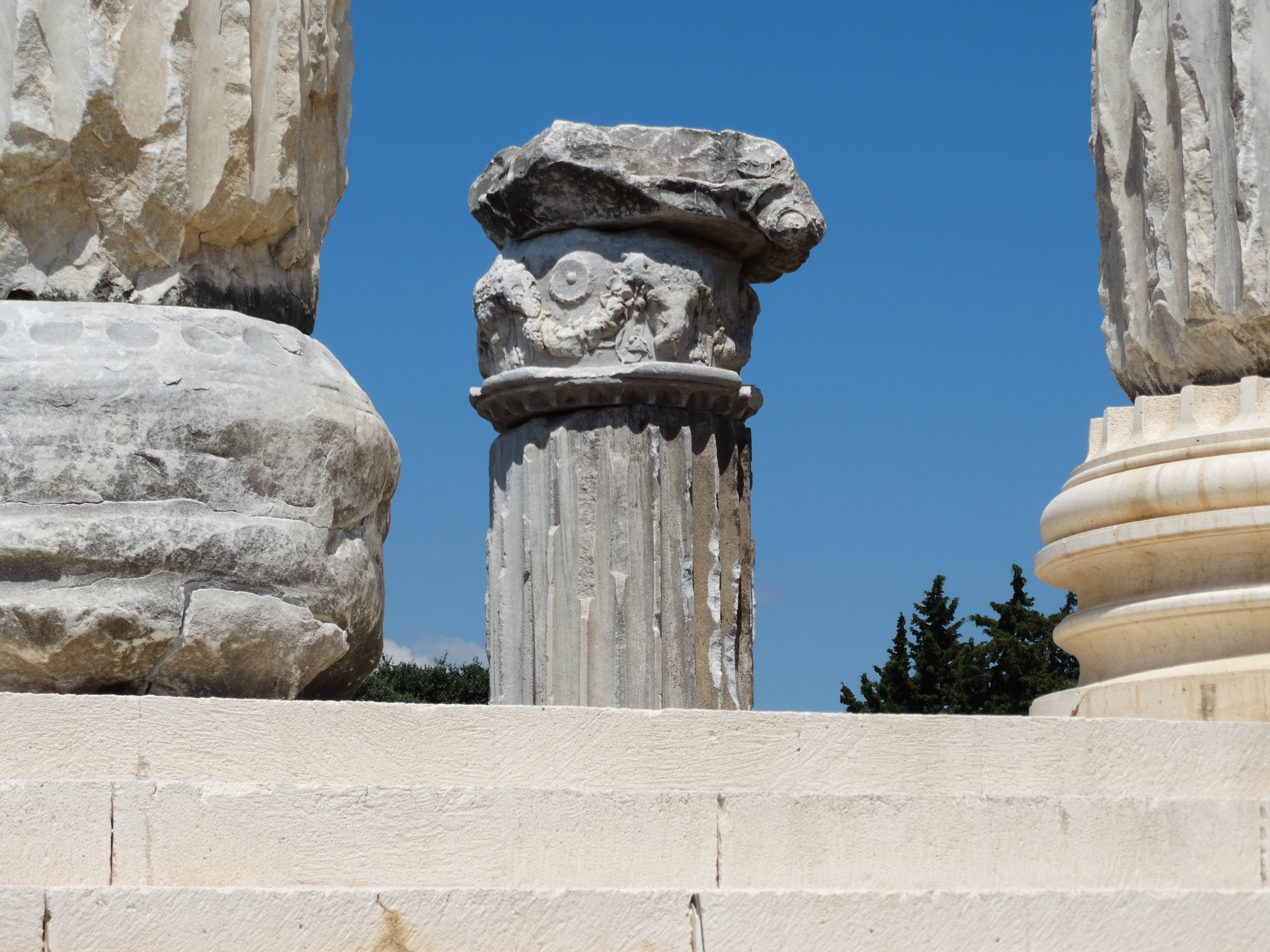

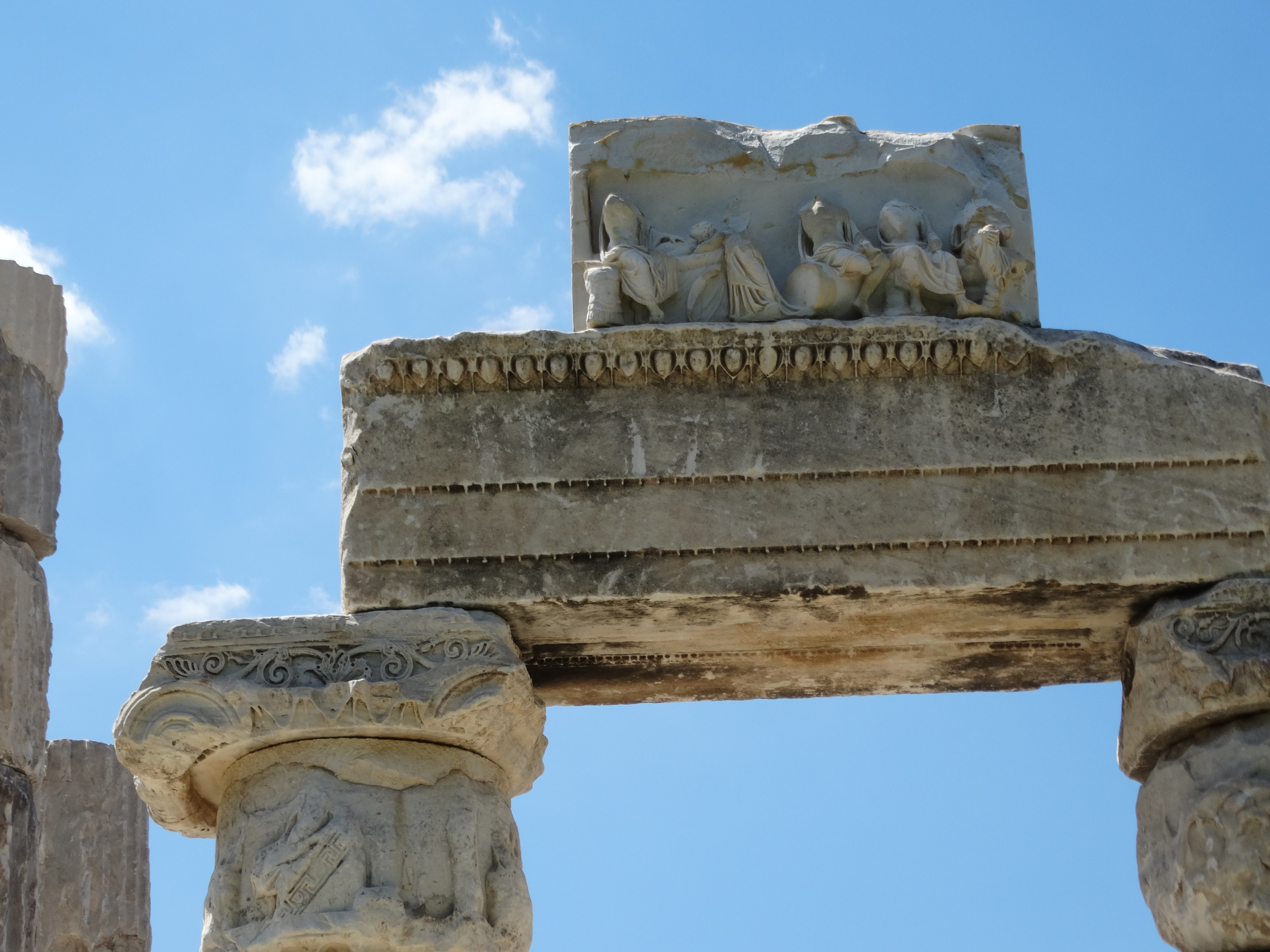

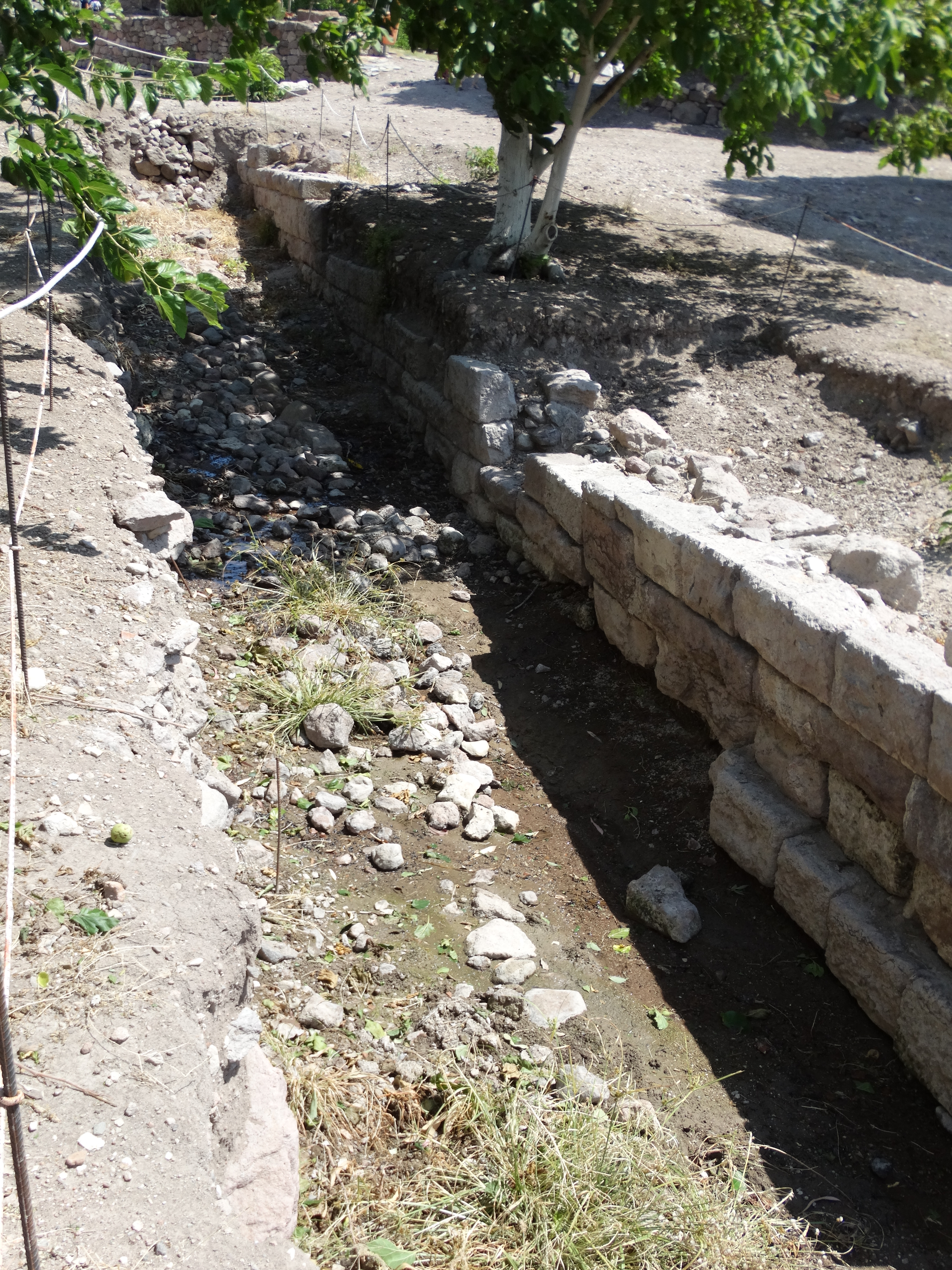

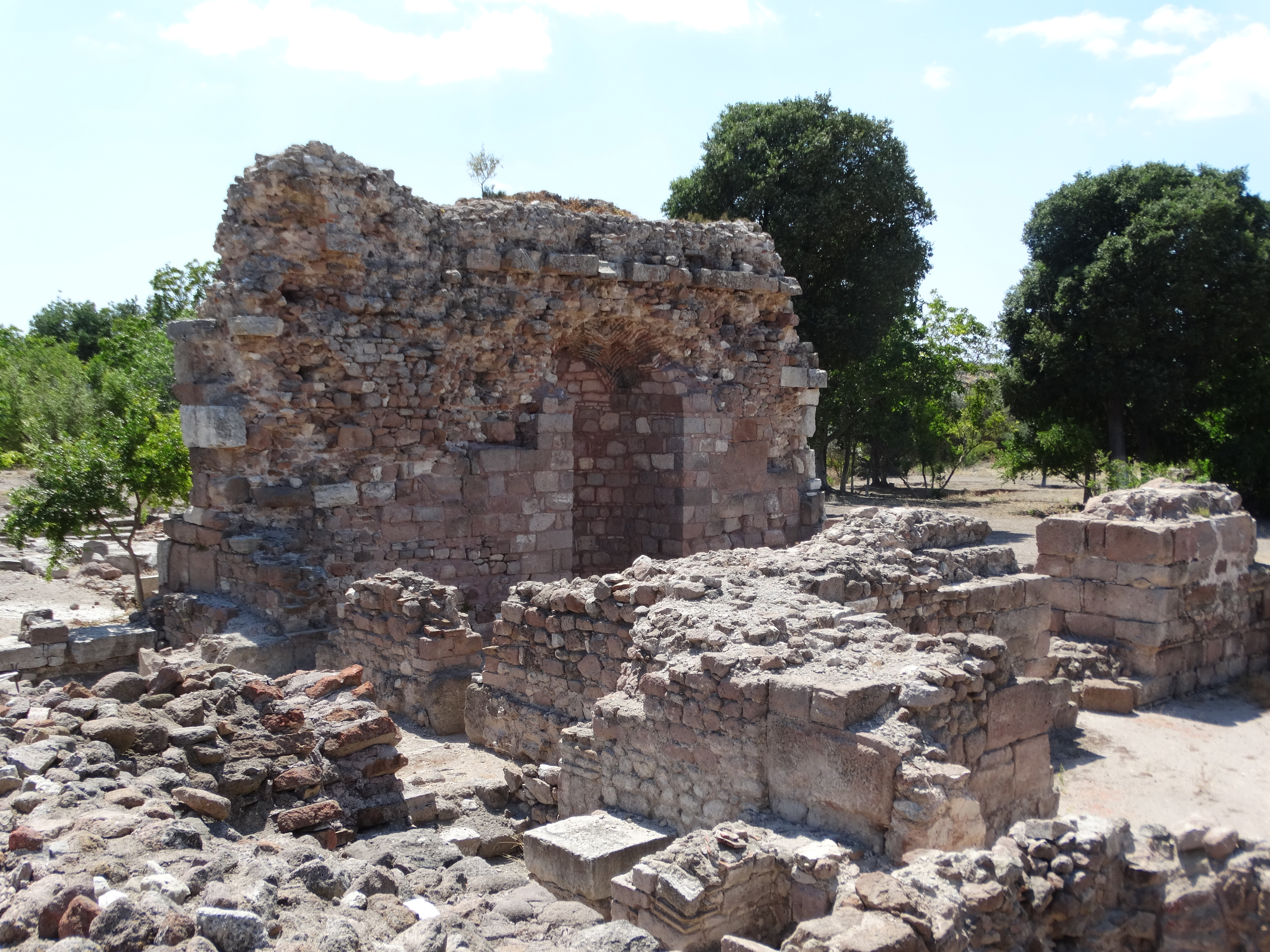

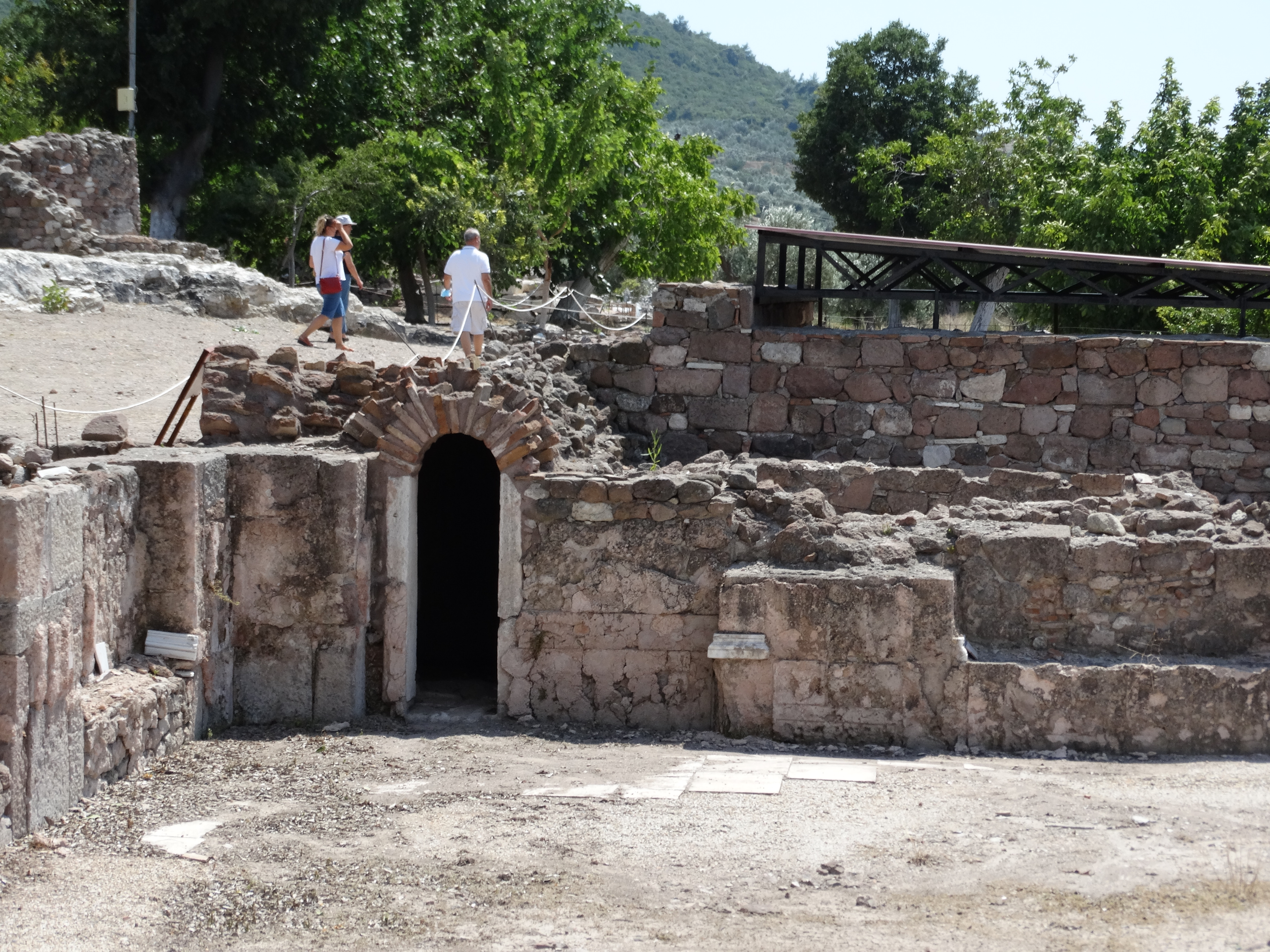

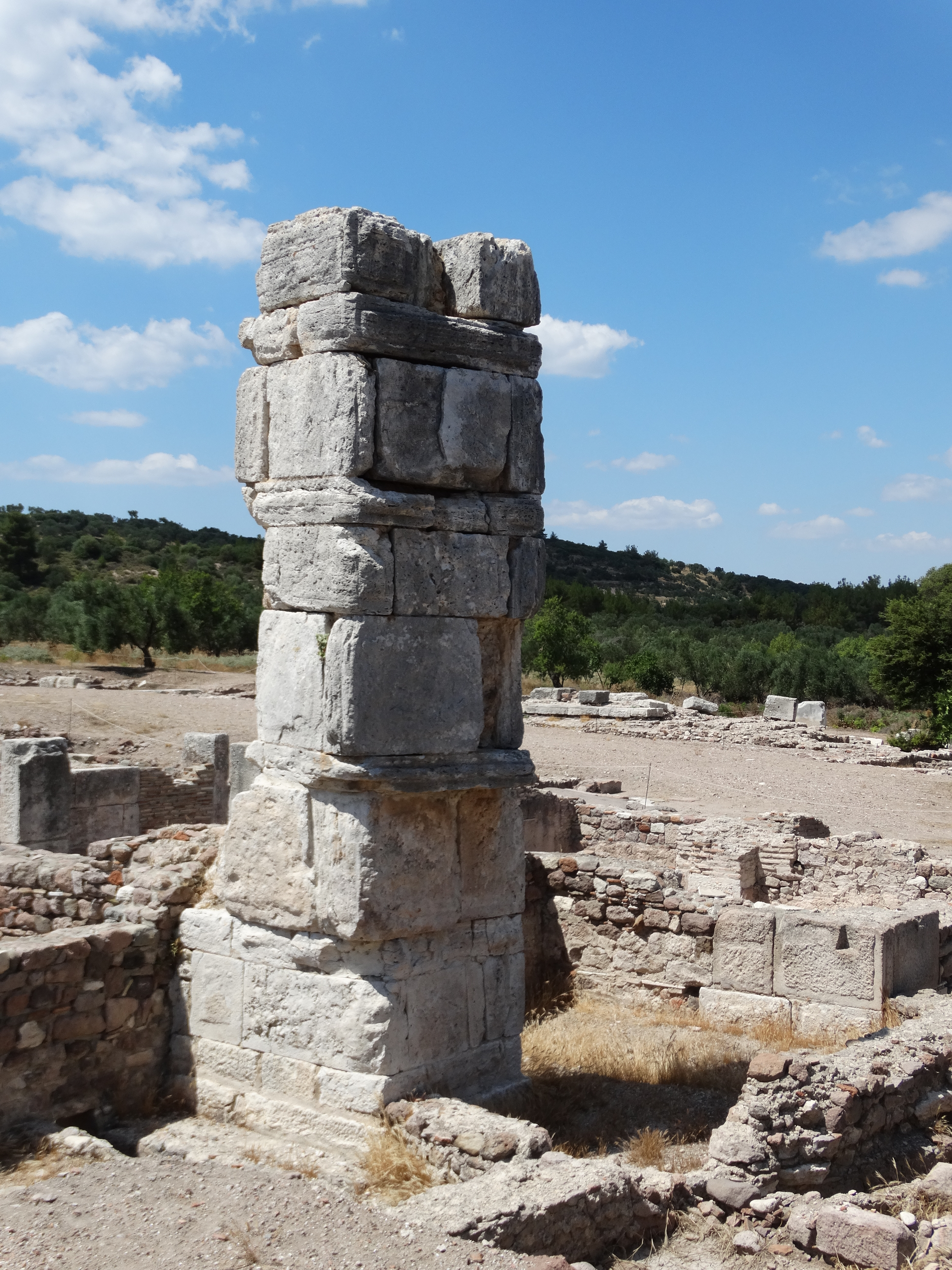

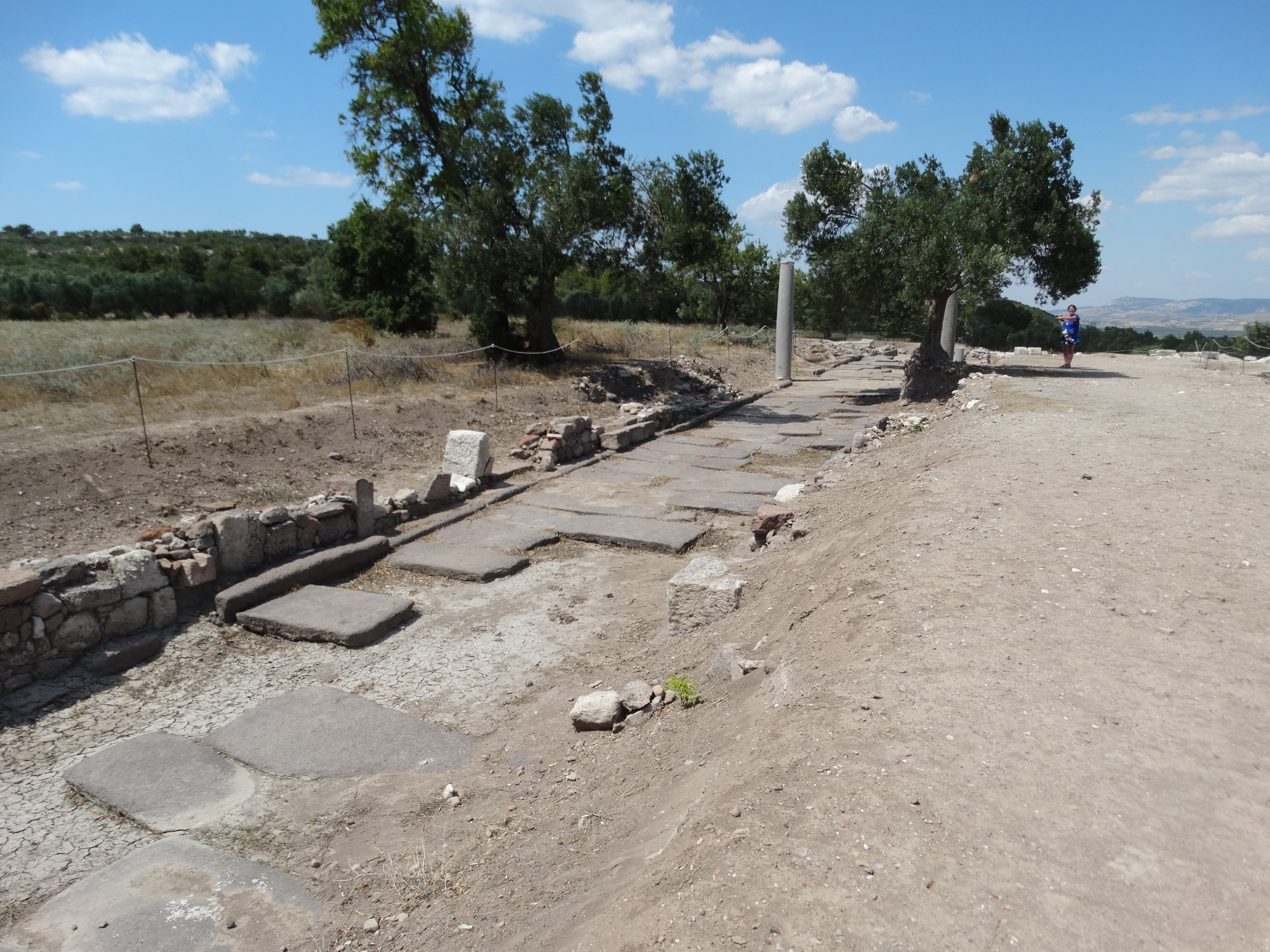

== History ==
=== Archaic and Classical ===
Hamaxitus is believed to have first been settled by Mytilenaeans in the 8th or 7th centuries BC; however, insufficient excavation has been done at the site to prove this definitively. It was one of the Actaean cities in the Troad which Athens took from Mytilene following the end of the Mytilenean revolt in 427 BC and appears in tribute assessments for 425/4 and 422/1 BC. In 425/4 BC it had an assessment of 4 talents, a relatively high figure compared to other cities in the Troad; a large part of this wealth would have been derived from the salt pans at nearby Tragasai, which records from the Ottoman period indicate could be highly productive. A fragment of the so-called Standards Decree, which dates to the 420s BC and imposed the use of Athenian weights, measures, and coins on members of the Delian League, was found at the nearby village of Gülpınar.

Following the defeat of Athens at the end of the Peloponnesian War in 403 BC, Hamaxitus enjoyed a brief period of freedom from outside interference. In 399 BC it was forcibly re-incorporated into the Persian Empire before being freed once more by the Spartan Dercylidas in 398 BC. In the 4th century BC Hamaxitus began minting its own coinage, which depicted a head of Apollo on the obverse, and either a lyre (a symbol of Apollo) with the legend ΑΜΑΞΙ (see above) on the reverse. This imagery was a reference to the famous sanctuary of Apollo Smintheus in the territory of Hamaxitus, and examples of the coinage have been found widely distributed across the Troad. Apart from the salt pans at Tragasai, Hamaxitus was also enriched by its excellent harbour in this period. Finds of Chian and Thasian wine amphorae from this period at Beşiktepe indicate Hamaxitus' involvement in Aegean trade, while an inscription dating to the mid-4th century BC honours a merchant from Cius in Bithynia with the right to import and export goods from Hamaxitus tax-free by both land and sea.

=== Hellenistic and Roman ===
In c. 310 BC Antigonus Monophthalmus, one of Alexander's Successors, created the new city of Antigoneia Troas by synoecizing several communities in the Troad. Scholars are divided as to whether Hamaxitus was synoecized immediately or at a later date, but the most recent research (based on a reappraisal of the numismatic, epigraphic, and archaeological evidence) suggests that Hamaxitus was not synoecized until c. 188 - c. 171 BC. In the early Hellenistic period, Hamaxitus continued to promote its link with Apollo Smintheus, introducing a second and more elaborate series of coins advertising its link with the shrine. As the popularity of the cult of Apollo Smintheus grew in the Hellenistic period (see above), the convenient proximity of its port to the god's shrine meant Hamaxitus benefited from an increasing number of pilgrims passing through the city's harbour. The continuing profitability of the salt pans at Tragasai is clear from King Lysimachus' attempt to tax them c. 301-281 BC, while the importance of this income to Hamaxitus is indicated by their strident (and successful) lobbying of Lysimachus for tax exemption on the salt pans. In the last decade of the 4th century BC we hear of Hamaxitus honouring a friend of Antigonus Monophthalmus, Nicomedes of Kos, and c. 230-220 BC it appeared along the route of the Delphic thearodokoi.

The settlement at Hamaxitus appears to have survived at least until the early Roman period following its synoecism with Alexandreia Troas (the city had been renamed from Antigoneia Troas following the death of Antigonus at the Battle of Ipsus in 301 BC). The fame of Apollo Smintheus only increased following the synoecism, which rebuilt the temple, created a new festival in the god's honour, and featured Apollo Smintheus on its coins until the mid-3rd century AD. The Smintheum continued to appear on Roman and early mediaeval itineraries such as the Tabula Peutingeriana (4th or 5th century) and the Ravenna Cosmography (7th or 8th century). It is therefore likely that the port at Beşiktepe was still used by pilgrims, even if the settlement of Hamaxitus had long since declined.

== Bibliography ==
- W. W. Goodwin, Greek Grammar Rev. ed. (London, 1894).
- V. R. Grace, 'Scopas in Chryse' JHS 52 (1932) 228–232.
- L. Robert, 'Villes de Carie et d'Ionie dans la liste des théorodoques de Delphes' BCH 70 (1946) 506–23.
- P. Chantraine, Dictionnaire étymologique de la langue grecque: histoire des mots, 4 vols. (Paris, 1968–80)
- J. M. Cook, The Troad: An Archaeological and Topographical Study (Oxford, 1973) 231–5.
- L. Robert, 'Documents d'Asie Mineure' BCH 106 (1982) 309–78.
- J. M. Cook, 'Cities in and around the Troad' ABSA 83 (1988) 7–19.
- C. Dougherty, 'Archaic Greek foundation poetry: questions of genre and occasion' JHS 114 (1994) 35–46.
- M. Ricl, The Inscriptions of Alexandreia Troas (Bonn, 1997) 196–201.
- C. Özgünel, Smintheion, Troas’ta Kutsal bir Alan (Ankara, 2001).
- O. Hekster, 'Of mice and emperors: a note on Aelian De natura animalium 6.40' CP 97.4 (2002) 365–70.
- C. Carusi, Isole e Peree in Asia Minore (Pisa, 2003) 34–5.
- S. Mitchell, 'Hamaxitus' in M. H. Hansen and T. H. Nielsen (eds), An Inventory of Archaic and Classical Poleis (Oxford, 2004) no. 778.
- M. Finkelberg, Greeks and Pre-Greeks: Aegean Prehistory and Greek Heroic Tradition (Cambridge, 2005).
- A. Bresson, ‘Hamaxitos en Troade’ in J. Dalaison (ed), Espaces et pouvoirs dans l’Antqiuité de l’Anatolie à la Gaule. Hommages à Bernard Rémy (Grenoble, 2007) 139–58.
