= Antisthenes of Sparta =

Spartan admiral, active 412–399 BCE

Antisthenes of Sparta (Ancient Greek: Ἀντισθένης) was a Spartan admiral in the Peloponnesian War. Antisthenes was deployed in 412 BCE, as the commander of a squadron, to the coast of Asia Minor. He was named as the successor to Astyochus, in case the Spartan commissioners thought it necessary to deprive that officer of his command. He is mentioned again in 399 BCE when, along with two other commissioners, he was sent to inspect the state of affairs in Asia, and announce to Dercyllidas that his command was to be prolonged for another year. There was also an Athenian general called Antisthenes.

== See also ==
- Peloponnesian War
