= Alexandria Troas =

Ancient city of the Troad, Turkey

- Αλεξάνδρεια Τρωάς (Greek); Eski Stambul (Turkish)
- Sigeia, Antigonia Troas, Colonia Alexandria Augusta Troas, Troas
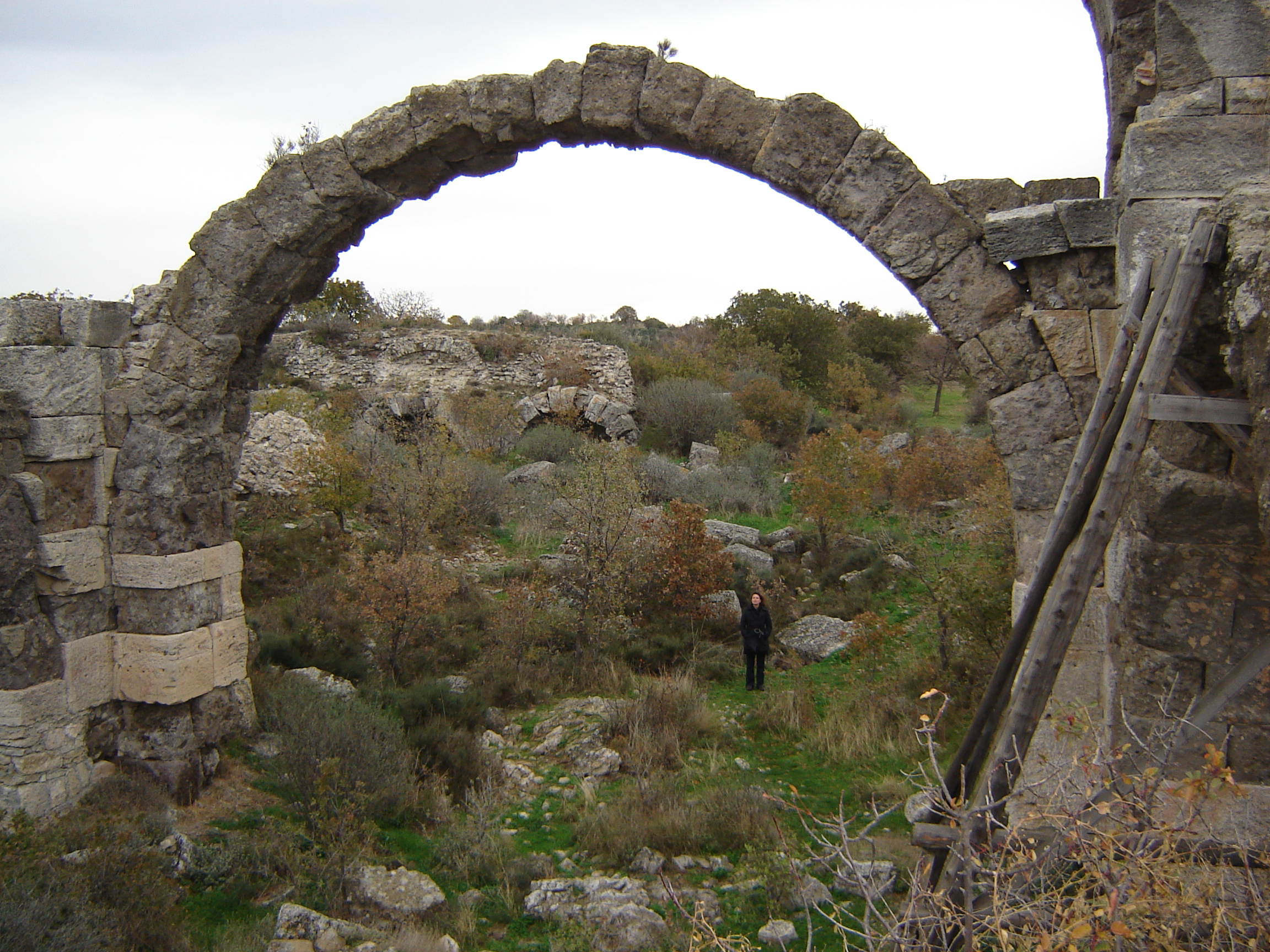
- Thermae in Alexandria Troas

- Location within Turkey
- 39°45′06″N 26°09′31″E
- Type: Settlement
- Location: Dalyan, Çanakkale Province, Turkey
- Region: Troad

Site notes
- Area: 400 ha (990 acres)

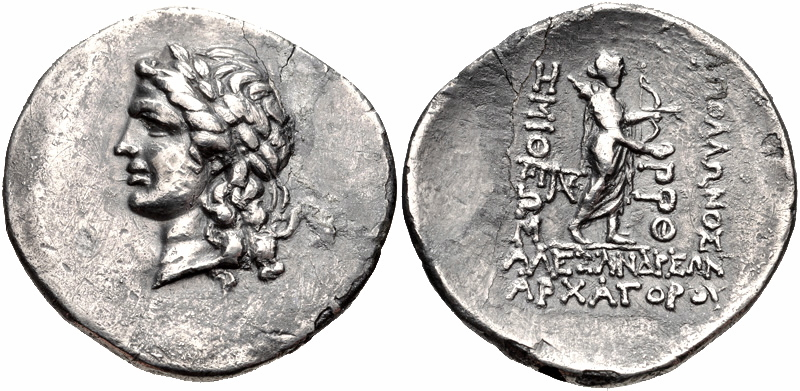
Coin (Didrachm) of Alexandreia, 102-66 BC. Obverse: Laureate head of Apollo. Reverse: Apollo Smintheus standing right, quiver over shoulder, holding bow, arrow, and patera, ΑΠΟΛΛΩΝΟΣ ΣΜΙΝΘΕΩΣ [ΑΛΕΞΑΝΔΡΕΩΝ ΑΡΧΑΓΟΡΟΥ in exergue].

Alexandria Troas ("Alexandria of the Troad"; Greek: Αλεξάνδρεια Τρωάς; Turkish: Eski Stambul, "Old Istanbul") is the site of an ancient Greek city situated on the Aegean Sea near the northern tip of Turkey's western coast, the area known historically as Troad, a little south of Tenedos (modern Bozcaada). It is located southeast of modern Dalyan, a village in the Ezine district of Çanakkale Province. The site sprawls over an estimated 400 hectares (990 acres); among the few structures remaining today are a ruined bath, an odeon, a theatre, gymnasium complex and a recently uncovered stadion. The circuit of the old walls can still be traced.

== History ==
=== Hellenistic ===
According to Strabo, this site was first called Sigia (Σιγία); around 306 BC Antigonus refounded the city as the much-expanded Antigonia Troas by settling the people of five other towns in Sigia, including the once influential city of Neandreia. It did not receive its name until its name was changed by Lysimachus to Alexandria Troas, in 301 BC, in memory of Alexander the Great of Macedon (Pliny merely states that the name changed from Antigonia to Alexandria). The city continued being called Alexandria Troas, as is stated in the 4th-5th c. AD Tabula Peutingeriana. As the chief port of north-west Asia Minor, the place prospered greatly in Roman times, becoming a "free and autonomous city" as early as 188 BC, and the existing remains sufficiently attest its former importance. In its heyday the city may have had a population of about 100,000. Strabo mentions that a Roman colony was created at the location in the reign of Augustus, named Colonia Alexandria Augusta Troas (called simply Troas during this period). Augustus, Hadrian and the rich grammarian Herodes Atticus contributed greatly to its embellishment; the aqueduct still preserved is due to the latter. Julius Caesar and Constantine considered making Troas the capital of the Roman Empire.

=== Roman ===
In Roman times, it was a significant port for travelling between Anatolia and Europe. According to the account in the Acts of the Apostles, Paul of Tarsus sailed for Europe for the first time from Alexandria Troas and returned there from Europe (it was there that the episode of the raising of Eutychus occurred). Ignatius of Antioch also paused at this city before continuing to his martyrdom at Rome.

=== Byzantine ===
Several of its later bishops are known: Marinus in 325; Niconius in 344; Sylvanus at the beginning of the 5th century; Pionius in 451; Leo in 787; Peter, friend of the Patriarch Ignatius, and adversary to Michael, in the ninth century. In the 10th century Troas is given as a suffragan of Cyzicus and distinct from the famous Troy (Heinrich Gelzer, Ungedruckte ... Texte der Notitiae episcopatuum, 552; Georgii Cyprii descriptio orbis romani, 64); it is not known when the city was destroyed and the diocese disappeared. The bishopric remains a titular see of the Catholic Church under the name Troas, vacant since 1971.

Troas is also a titular see of the Eastern Orthodox Church under the Ecumenical Patriarchate. Bishop Savas (Zembillas) of Troas served as hierarch from 2002 to 2011, and then became Metropolitan Savas (Zembillas) of Pittsburgh in the Greek Orthodox Archdiocese of America.

=== Ottoman ===
Karasid Turkomans settled in the area of the Troad in the 14th century. Their beylik was conquered by the Ottomans in 1336. The ruins of Alexandria Troas came to be known among the Turks as Eski Stambul, the "Old City". The site's stones were much plundered for building material (for example Mehmed IV took columns to adorn his Yeni Valide Mosque in Istanbul). As of the mid-18th century the site served as "a lurking place for bandetti".

=== Modern ===
By 1911, the site had been overgrown with Vallonea oaks and much plundered, but the circuit of the old walls could still be traced, and in several places they were fairly well preserved. They had a circumference of about ten kilometres, and were fortified with towers at regular intervals. Remains of an ancient bath and gymnasium complex can be found within this area; this building is locally known as Bal Saray (Honey Palace) and was originally endowed by Herodes Atticus in the year 135. Trajan built an aqueduct which can still be traced. The harbour had two large basins, now almost choked with sand. It is the subject of an early twenty-first century study by German archaeologists digging and surveying at the site. Their excavation uncovered the remains of a large stadium dating to about 100 BC.

== See also ==
- List of ancient Greek cities

== Bibliography ==
- Feuser, Stefan, Der Hafen von Alexandria Troas (Bonn: Dr. Rudolf Habelt, 2009) (Asia Minor Studien, 63).
