= Dercylidas =

Late 5th early 4th century BCE Spartan commander

Dercylidas (Greek: Δερκυλίδας) was a Spartan commander during the late 5th and early 4th century BCE. He was nicknamed Sisyphus for his cunning and inventiveness.

In 411 BCE he was appointed harmost at Abydos in the Hellespont. In 399 BCE he was told by Antisthenes of Sparta that his command would be prolonged for another year at least.

From 399 BCE to 397 BCE, Dercylidas succeeded Thibron as commander of the army that was sent to support the Ionian Greeks against the Persians. Arriving in Asia-Minor he took command of Thibron's army and advanced against the cities of the Troad; he took the cities of Hamaxitus, Colonae, Arisba, Ilium and Cerbenia. After this he concluded an armistice of eight months with Pharnabazus, the Satrap of Hellespontine Phrygia, and fought a campaign against the Thracians of Bithynia.

After having ravaged the Bithynian countryside he took his force across the Dardanelles to Europe on the behest of the Greeks of the Chersonese who were under attack from the Thracians of Europe. Dercylidas drove the Thracians from the peninsula and closed it off by constructing a wall which ran from sea to sea. After receiving many gifts from the local Greeks, he transported his army back to Asia.

Pharnabazus and Tissaphernes, the Satrap of Ionia and Lydia recruited a large army of 20,000 infantry and 10,000 cavalry from their Satrapies and marched on Ephesus, Sparta's base of operations in Asia-Minor. Dercylidas marched out his 7,000-strong army to give battle, but instead of a battle a truce was concluded.

After allying himself with Tissaphernes and Meidias, Dercylidas attacked Pharnabazus. In 396 BCE Spartan king Agesilaus sent Dercylidas from Amphipolis to the Hellespont. In 394 BCE Dercylidas was succeeded by King Agesilaus as supreme commander of the Spartan forces in Asia-Minor.

== Sources ==
- Diodorus Siculus, Bibliotheca Historica, Book XIV.
- Xenophon, Hellenica Books I and III.
