= Cycnus =

Several characters in Greek mythology

In Greek mythology, several characters were known as Cycnus (Ancient Greek: Κύκνος, romanized: Kyknos) or Cygnus. The literal meaning of the name is "swan", and accordingly most of them ended up being transformed into swans.

- Cycnus, son of Ares.
- Cycnus, king of Kolonai. Son of Poseidon.
- Cycnus, lover of Phaethon.
- Cycnus, son of Apollo.
- Cycnus, son of King Ederion (Ancient Greek: Ἐδερίων) or Eredion of Achaea, who, in the 6th century CE account of John Malalas, seduced Leda and made her mother of triplets: the Dioscuri and Helen. In all other sources, she had these children by Zeus who approached her in the shape of a swan (kyknos). For more information, see Leda and the Swan.
- Cycnus, one of the Suitors of Penelope who came from Dulichium along with other 56 wooers. He, with the other suitors, was shot dead by Odysseus with the assistance of Eumaeus, Philoetius, and Telemachus.
- Cycnus, a blunder for Guneus in the manuscript of Hyginus (list of the Achaean leaders against Troy).

According to Pseudo-Eratosthenes and Hyginus' Poetical Astronomy, the constellation Cygnus was the stellar image of the swan Zeus had changed into in order to seduce Leda or Nemesis. Pausanias and Servius state that Apollo turned Cycnus of Liguria into a swan after the death of his lover Phaeton, then later placed him among the stars as the constellation Cygnus.
