= Troad =

Historical name of the Turkish Biga Peninsula

Coordinates: 39.8°N 26.5°E

- Ancient region
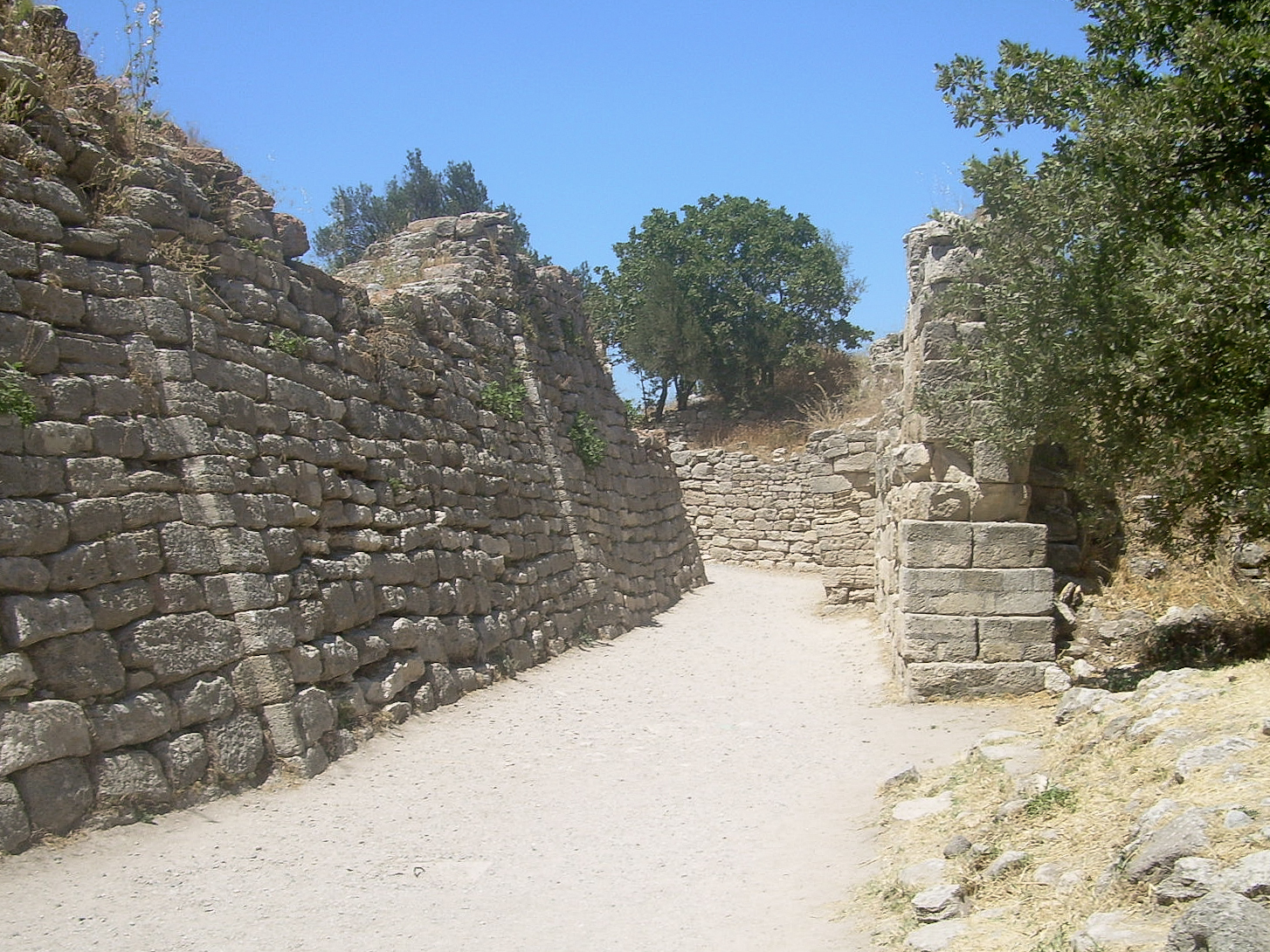
- Part of the walls of Troy
- Location: Northwestern Anatolia, Turkey
- Historical capital: Troy (modern-day Tevfikiye, Çanakkale, Turkey)
- Roman province: Asia

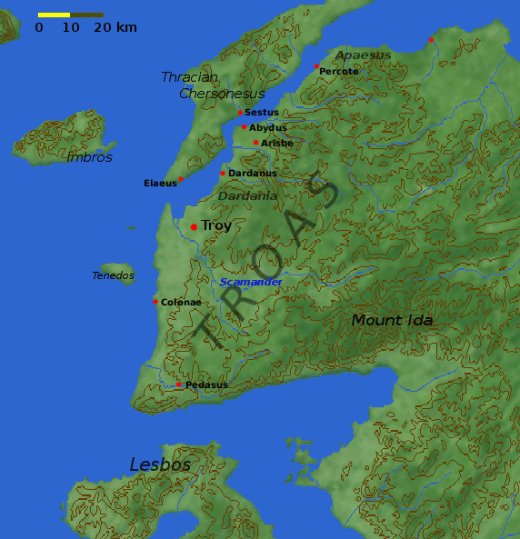
A map of the Troad (Troas)

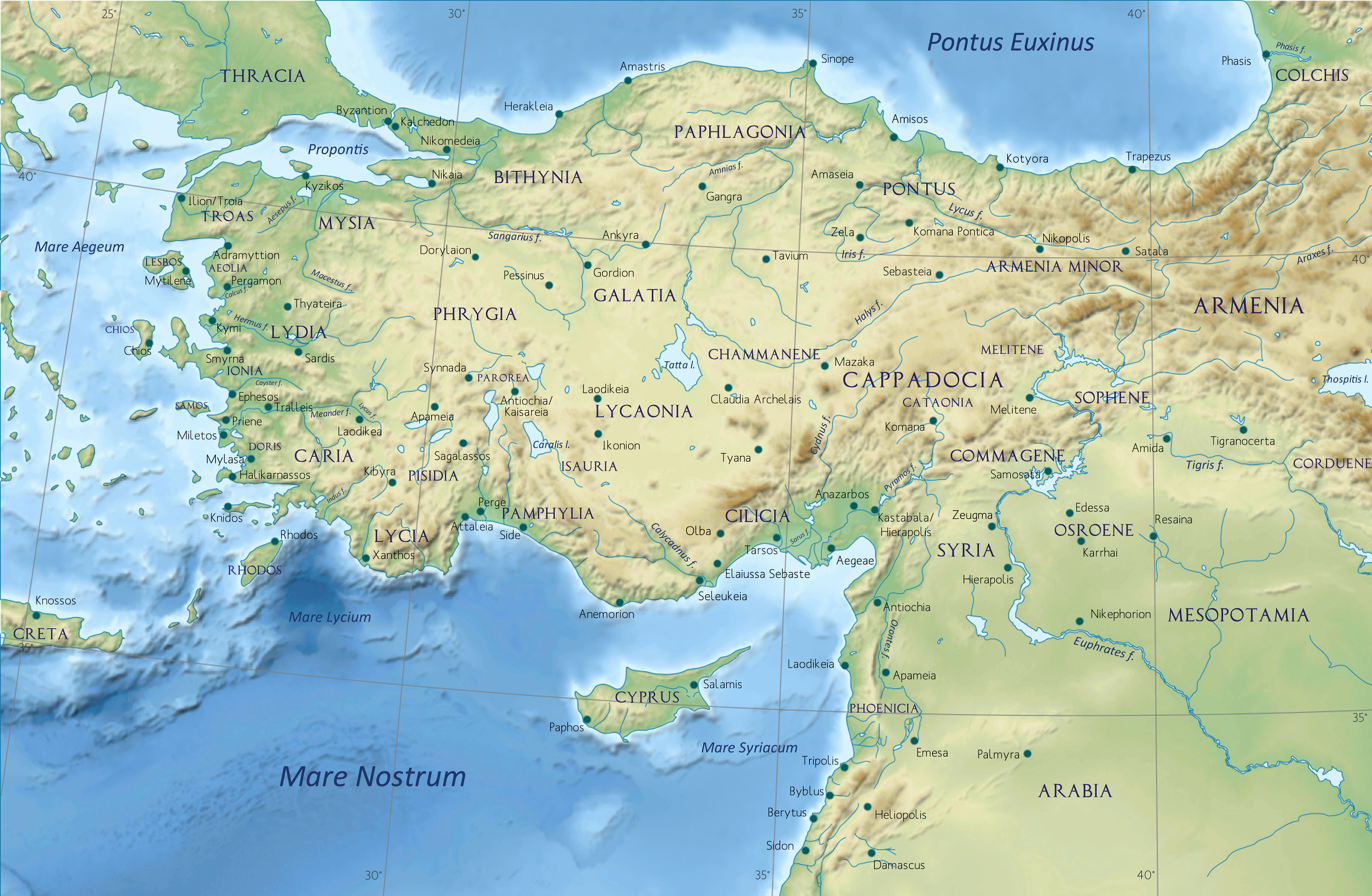
Troas among the classical regions of Anatolia. Troas is at upper left, south of Thracia, west of Mysia.

The Troad (/ˈtroʊæd/ TROH-ad or /ˈtroʊəd/ TROH-əd; Greek: Τρωάδα, romanized: Troáda) or Troas (/ˈtroʊəs/ TROH-əs; Ancient Greek: Τρῳάς, romanized: Trōiás, or Τρωϊάς, Trōïás) is a historical region in northwestern Anatolia. It corresponds with the Biga Peninsula (Turkish: Biga Yarımadası) in the Çanakkale Province of modern Turkey. Bounded by the Dardanelles to the northwest and by the Aegean Sea to the west, and separated from the rest of Anatolia by the massif that forms Mount Ida, the Troad is drained by two main rivers, the Scamander (Karamenderes) and the Simoeis, which join in the area containing the ruins of Troy.

== History ==
The Troad is first mentioned by that name in Hittite records as Taruiša. This identification was first put forth by Emil Forrer, but largely disputed by most Hittite experts until 1983 when Houwink ten Cate showed that two fragments were from the same original cuneiform tablet and in his discussion of the restored letter showed that Taruiša and Wiluša (Troy) were correctly placed in northwestern Anatolia.

Greek settlements flourished in Troas during the Archaic and Classical ages, as evidenced by the number of Greek poleis that coined money in their own names.

The region was part of the satrapy (province) of Hellespontine Phrygia of the Achaemenid Empire until its conquest by Alexander the Great. After this it fell to the Diadoch Seleucid Empire, and then passed to Rome's ally, the kingdom of Pergamon. The Attalid kings of Pergamon (now Bergama) later ceded Mysia, including the territory of the Troad, to the Roman Republic, on the death of King Attalus III in 133 BC.

Under the Roman Empire, the territory of the Troad became part of the province of Asia, and later of the smaller Mysian province Hellespontus; it was important enough to have suffragan bishoprics, including Pionia (now Avcılar).

Under the later Byzantine Empire, it was included in the thema of the Aegean Islands.

Following its conquest by the Ottoman Empire, the Troad formed part of the sanjak of Biga.

== New Testament ==
The apostles Paul and Silas first visited Troas during their journey from Galatia to Macedonia. Paul also referred to Troas when he asked his fellow evangelist Timothy out of Ephesus, to bring the cloak he had left there, a journey of about 500 kilometres (300 mi). The changes from the story, being recounted as "they" to "we" in Acts 16 and Acts 20, imply that Paul was joined by Luke when he went through Troas.

== See also ==
- Acts of Apostles
- Alexandria Troas
- Ancient regions of Anatolia
- List of traditional Greek place names
