= Cycnus (son of Poseidon) =

Son of Poseidon in Greek mythology

In Greek mythology, Cycnus (Ancient Greek: Κύκνος, romanized: Kyknos, lit. 'swan') or Cygnus was the king of the town of Kolonai in the southern Troad.

== Family ==
Cycnus was the son of Poseidon by Calyce (daughter of Hecaton), Harpale, or by Scamandrodice. According to John Tzetzes, his mother Scamandrodice abandoned him on the seashore, but he was rescued by fishermen who named him Cycnus "swan" because they saw a swan flying over him. In another account, he was said to have had womanly white skin and fair hair, which was why he received his name that meant "swan".

Cycnus married first Procleia, daughter of King Laomedon of Troy or of Laomedon's son Clytius. Cycnus and Procleia had two children, named Tenes and Hemithea, although Tenes claimed the god Apollo as his father. On Procleia's death, Cycnus married Philonome, daughter of Tragasus (Cragasus), also known as Polyboea or Scamandria.

Dictys Cretensis mentions three more children of Cycnus: two sons, Cobis and Corianus, and a daughter Glauce. A scholion to Homer's Iliad adds another, Laodice, who is taken as war-prize of Odysseus.

Comparative table of Cycnus' family
Relation	Names	Sources													
Relation	Names	Epic Cycle Frag.	Sch. on Homer	Sch. on Pindar	Lycophron	Diodorus	(Sch. on) Ovid	Seneca	Apollodorus		Hyginus	Pausanias		Dictys	Tzetzes
Parentage	Poseidon	✓					✓	✓				✓			
Parentage	Poseidon and Harpale			✓											
Parentage	Poseidon and Calyce										✓				
Parentage	Poseidon and Scamandrodice														✓
Wife	Polyboea		✓												
Wife	Procleia								✓			✓			
Wife	Philonome									✓			✓		
Wife	Scamandria						✓								
Children	Tennes				✓	✓			✓			✓			
Children	Hemithea				✓				✓			✓			
Children	Cobis													✓	
Children	Corianus													✓	
Children	Glauce													✓	

== Mythology ==
Philonome fell in love with her handsome stepson, Tenes. Tenes rejected Philonome's advances, whereupon Philonome falsely accused Tenes before her husband of having ravished her. Cycnus ordered to place both his children in a chest and throw it into the sea. However, Cycnus discovered the truth and had Philonome buried alive. When he found that his children had survived and were reigning at Tenedos, he sailed there intending to reconcile with them, but Tenes cut the anchor rope of his ship.

Cycnus later supported the Trojans in the Trojan War, and fought valiantly, killing one thousand opponents according to Ovid. According to some accounts he killed the Greek hero Protesilaus, but according to others, Cycnus attacked the Greek camp when the funeral of Protesilaus was underway. It was said that Cycnus, being the son of Poseidon, was invulnerable to spear and sword attack. When Achilles confronted Cycnus he could not kill him via conventional weaponry so he crushed and suffocated him. After his death, Cycnus was changed into a swan. Later, the Greek army invaded Cycnus's kingdom, but the people of Colonae implored them to spare the city. The Greek leaders agreed, on condition that Cobis, Corianus and Glauce be handed over to them, and made a truce with the citizens. According to Tzetzes, the two sons of Cycnus were instead killed by Diomedes.

The armor of Cycnus was later awarded to King Agapenor, the victor of the long jump at the funeral games of Achilles.

== Legacy ==
Virgil borrowed heavily from Cycnus when making the character Messapus for the Aeneid. Messapus is the son of Neptune, and like Cycnus was said to be invulnerable.
