= Scamandrodice =

In Greek mythology, Scamandrodice (Ancient Greek: Σκαμανδροδίκη, romanized: Skamandrodíkē, lit. 'justice of the Scamander') was the mother of King Cycnus of Colonae by the sea-god Poseidon. She abandoned her son on the seashore but he was rescued by fishermen who named him Cycnus "swan" because they saw a swan flying over him. In some accounts, the mother of Cycnus was given as Harpale or Calyce, daughter of Hecaton or lastly, an unknown Nereid.
