= Islands of Diomedes =

Archipelago

The Islands of Diomedes (Διομήδειοι) were named after Diomedes, King of Argos. Diomedia (Διομήδεια), one of these islands, was according to the Greek myths where Diomedes was buried. The islands are associated with the modern-day Palagruža archipelago.

Pliny the Elder writes that on Diomedia there was a monument of Diomedes.

Antoninus Liberalis writes that after the death of Diomedes, the Illyrians attacked the island and killed all the Dorians there, but Zeus disappeared their bodies and turned their souls into birds. These birds flee from the foreigners, but approach the Greeks.

In On Marvellous Things Heard, Pseudo-Aristotle says that on the island there were big birds which sit around the Diomedes shrine in a circle and that these birds were the companions of Diomedes. When Greeks come to the island they are quiet, but if foreigners land they attack them. Lycophron also wrote about the companions of Diomedes who turned into seabirds and their friendly behavior towards the Greeks.

Strabo writes that, according to some myths, Diomedes companions were turned into birds, and they are tame towards honorable men and flee from wicked and knavish men.

Aelian writes that on the island there were many shearwaters and these birds did not approach the foreigners, but they approach and welcome the Greeks and that according to legend, the birds were companions of Diomedes and fought together with him at Troy, but later they changed into birds, but they preserved their Greek nature.

Solinus writes that on the island there were the tomb of Diomedes and a shrine dedicated to him, and that the island had some kind of birds which cannot be found anywhere else and are called Diomedes birds.

Augustine writes that the birds were flying around the temple, and they fill their beaks with water and sprinkle it in the temple, and also that they attack the foreigners but welcome the Greeks. Stephanus of Byzantium also mention the birds.

The biological family of Diomedeidae, to which the albatross belongs, and the genus name for the great albatrosses, Diomedea, comes from the metamorphosis of the companions of Diomedes into birds.
