= Actaeus (mythology) =

Set of mythological Greek characters

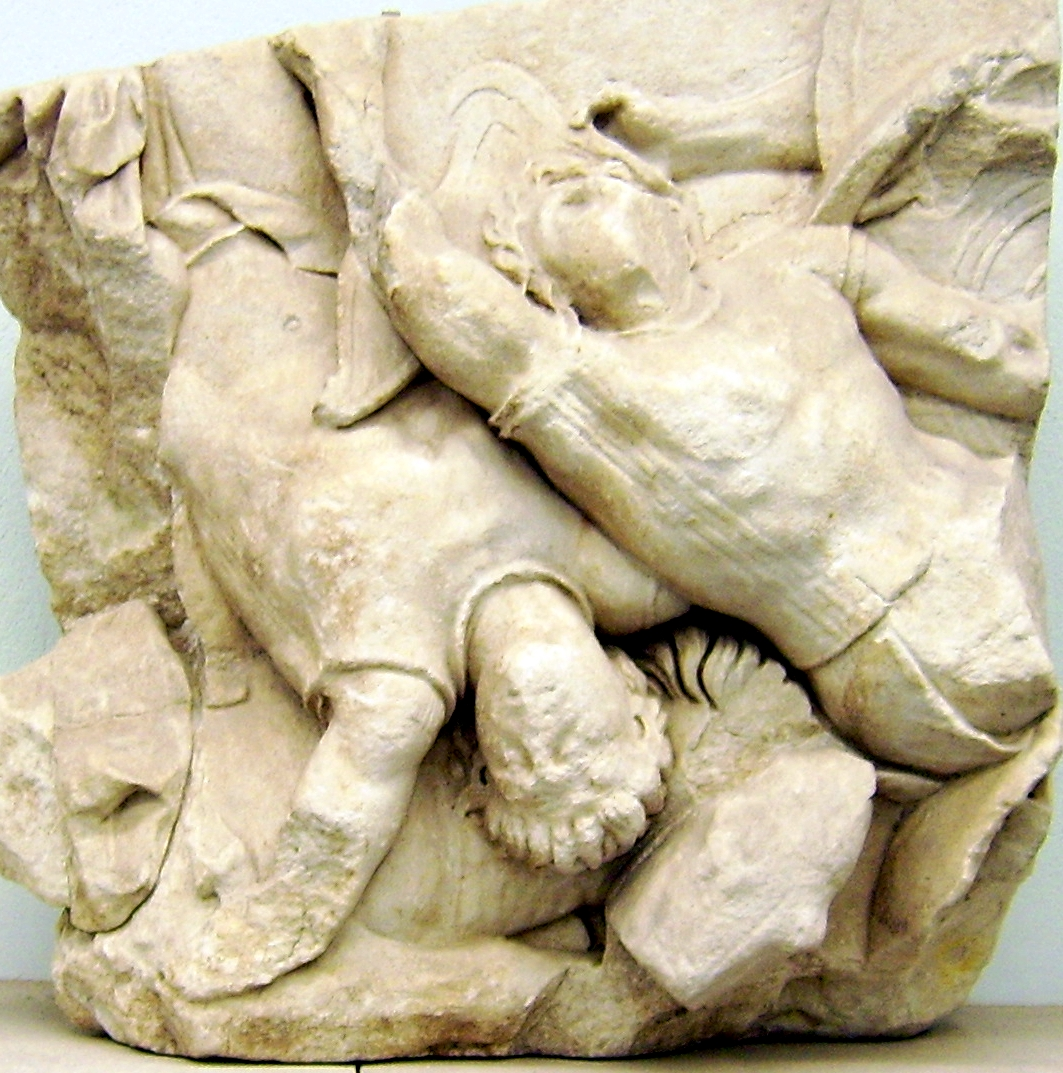
A relief on the interior Telephus frieze of the Pergamon Altar depicting Ajax killing Actaeus and Heloros.

Actaeus (/ækˈtiːəs/; Ancient Greek: Ἀκταῖος, romanized: Aktaîos, lit. 'coast-man') was the name of three individuals appearing in Greek mythology:

- Actaeus, a king of Attica.
- Actaeus, father of Telamon by Glauce, daughter of Cychreus. He was the grandfather of Ajax of Salamis.
- Actaeus, one of the Telchines.
