= Cometes (son of Sthenelus) =

Cometes (Ancient Greek: Κομήτης) was the son of Sthenelus.

When Diomedes left to fight in the Trojan War, he entrusted Cometes with the care of his kingdom and household.

After Diomedes wounded Aphrodite at Troy, the goddess took revenge by causing Aegialeia, the wife of Diomedes, to desire adulterous relationships and by filling Cometes with desire for her. Another version says that Aphrodite caused Aegialeia to fall in love with Hippolytus, the son of Cometes, rather than with Cometes himself.

According to another tradition, the story of Cometes is connected with the revenge of Nauplius, the father of Palamedes. After Palamedes was falsely accused by Odysseus and killed, Nauplius sought revenge against the Greek leaders by arranging for their wives to become unfaithful, including Aegialeia, whom he brought together with Cometes.

When Diomedes returned from Troy, he found Aegialeia in a relationship with Cometes. Cometes pursued Diomedes with his bodyguard, intending to kill him, forcing Diomedes to flee to Italy. Another account says that Diomedes feared Aegialeia would kill him and therefore fled to Italy.

According to the Chiliades, when Diomedes returned home, he found that his wife had entered into an adulterous relationship with Cometes. Rather than remaining in his homeland, he fled to Italy.
