= Pelagosite =

General
- Category: Minerals
- Formula: CaCO_{3}

Identification
- Color: White, grey, brown
- Luster: Pearly

Pelagosite is a form of pisolitic aragonite (CaCO_{3}) whose type locality is the Croatian island group of Palagruža (Italian Pelagosa, whence the name) in the middle of the Adriatic. It was identified by R. Moser in Mineralogische und petrographische Mitteilungen, new series (Vienna) 1 (1878), 174. It has a higher content of magnesium carbonate, strontium carbonate, calcium sulfate (gypsum) and silicon dioxide(silica) than is found in typical limy sediments elsewhere. It occurs as a superficial calcareous crust no more than a few millimetres thick, which is generally white, grey, or brownish with a pearly lustre. It was believed to be formed in the intertidal zone by saltwater spray and evaporation, but an algal contribution has recently been suggested (Montanari and others (2007)), following an overlooked earlier proposal by E. Onorato in 1926.
