= Palagruža =

Islands in Split-Dalmatia County, Croatia

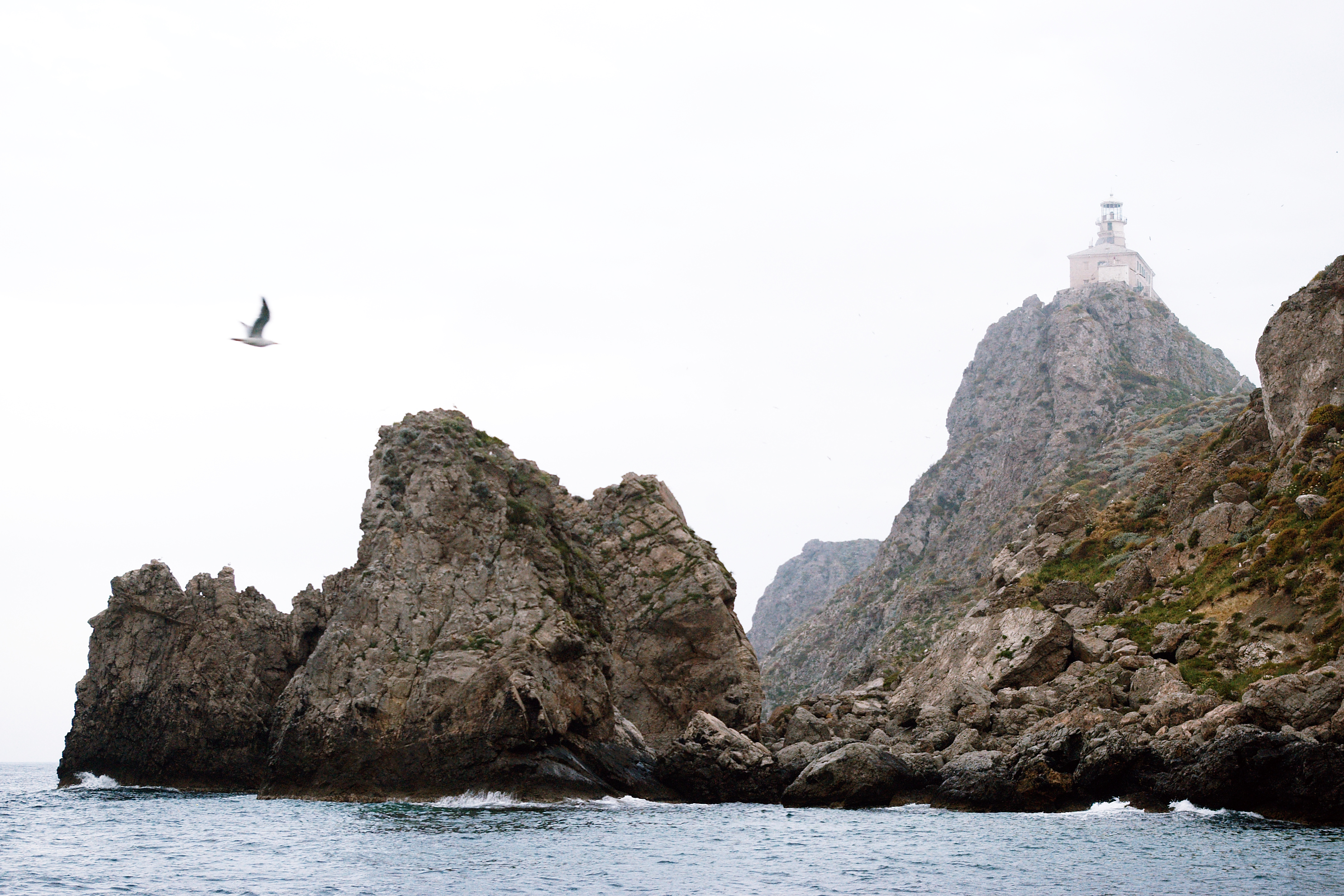
Vela Palagruža and the lighthouse

Palagruža (pronounced [palǎɡruːʒa];) is a small Croatian archipelago in the middle of the Adriatic Sea. It is uninhabited, except by lighthouse staff and occasional summer tourists. Palagruža can be reached only by a chartered motorboat, requiring a journey of several hours from nearby islands like Lastovo, Korčula, or Vis. It is administratively part of the municipality of Komiža.

== Etymology ==
The place is known in Italian as Pelagosa, derived from Ancient Greek Pelagousae (Πελαγούσαι, 'sea (islands)'). This is the source of the current Croatian name, as well as of the name of pelagosite. Gruž also means 'ballast' in Croatian, and the term is therefore well known in two ways to seafarers. The islands are also associated with the Greek mythology Diomedia or Islands of Diomedes.

== History ==
Authentic archaeological finds from the Neolithic period have been discovered on Palagruža, including a small number of early Neolithic Impressed Ware pottery dated to the 6th–4th millennia BC, as well as a larger quantity of Ljubljana-Adriatic culture (first half of the 3rd millennium BC) and Cetina culture artifacts (latter half of the 3rd millennium BC).

Artifacts indicating human presence on Palagruža from the 2nd millennium BC are rarer, but there are substantial finds from ancient Greek seafarers, including material from the Late Archaic, Classical, Hellenistic, and Early Roman periods. There are also recorded archaeological finds from the Late Roman and early medieval periods.

Palagruža is associated with the Island of Diomedes, a location named after the Homeric hero Diomedes, who was reputedly buried there. This speculation is supported by the discovery of a painted 6th-century BC Greek potsherd inscribed with the name Diomed[es], suggesting the existence of a shrine of the Cult of Diomedes on Palagruža.

It is recorded that the galley fleet of Pope Alexander III landed on Palagruža on 9 March 1177.

The archipelago appears on maps from the early 14th century as Pelagosa, Pellegoxa, and Pelogosa.

In the 15th and 16th centuries, fishing activity in the area increased, making the island the centre of a traditional fishing ground for the community of Komiža on the island of Vis, Croatia.

Following the fall of the Republic of Venice, sanctioned by the Treaty of Campo Formio of 1797 between Napoleon and the Austrian authorities, all the formerly Venetian islands in the Adriatic passed to Austria. In 1806 these islands became part of the Napoleonic Kingdom of Italy, and the Pelagose were specifically mentioned in a decree issued by the General Superintendent of Dalmatia, Vincenzo Dandolo, authorizing fishermen from Komiža to use sardellare nets, or voighe, in the surrounding waters. From 1809 to 1815 the islands were formally part of the Illyrian Provinces of the French Empire, after which they returned to Austrian control following the Congress of Vienna (1815). They were then registered in the district of Lissa, circle of Spalato, in the Kingdom of Dalmatia. Some geographical works of the period described the Pelagose islands as Neapolitan, while others considered them Austrian.

There is no evidence that the Kingdom of the Two Sicilies ever took concrete action to establish sovereignty over the Pelagose, while the Austrian authorities continued to exercise it, sending ships and missions aimed at building a lighthouse, particularly in 1858 (Pietro Acerboni, embarked on the Austrian paddle steamer SMS Curtatone, and in charge of the lighthouses of the Deputation of the Stock Exchange of Trieste). During this period the archipelago was uninhabited except temporarily; consequently—like nearby Pianosa—there are no entries for it in the civil registry of the district of Serracapriola, to which the Tremiti Islands belonged, while records appear in the parish registers of Komiža on the island of Lissa. The inhabitants of Komiža had built a chapel dedicated to San Michele in the 18th century, later reconstructing it in the first half of the 19th century. The new Kingdom of Italy claimed possession of the islands and planned the construction of a lighthouse, leading to opposition from Vienna. After reviewing the documentation within the framework of a joint Italian–Austro-Hungarian hydrographic commission for the Adriatic, sovereignty was recognized as belonging to Vienna, as confirmed by the British consul in Trieste, Richard Francis Burton, who reported that the Komižani had presented documentation in support of this claim.

After Italy's entry into World War I in May 1915, its armed forces occupied the islands on 11 July 1915. The Italian submarine Nereide was sunk there on 5 August 1915 by the Austro-Hungarian submarine SM U-5.

The archipelago reverted to Italian control between the two World Wars, as part of the Province of Zara (now Zadar, Croatia), and was ceded to the Socialist Federal Republic of Yugoslavia in 1947. Since the breakup of Yugoslavia, it has been part of Croatia.

== Geography ==
Palagruža consists of one larger island, called Vela or Velika ('Great') Palagruža, and a smaller one, Mala ('Little') Palagruža, as well as a dozen nearby rocks and reefs composed of dolomite. All the main islets are in the form of steep ridges. Vela Palagruža is some 1,400 metres (4,600 feet) long and 330 metres (1,080 feet) wide. The highest point of the archipelago, on Vela Palagruža, is about 90 metres (300 feet) above sea level.

The archipelago is 123 km (76 mi; 66 nmi) south of Split on the Croatian mainland, 60 km (37 mi; 32 nmi) south-west of Lastovo, Croatia, and 53 km (33 mi; 29 nmi) north-north-east of the Gargano peninsula in Italy. It is visible from land only from other remote islands of Italy and Croatia. Palagruža is further south than the mainland peninsula of Prevlaka, making it the southernmost point of Croatia.

=== Geology ===
Velika Palagruža is an apical part of subsurface geological complex, composed of carbonate, siliciclastic and evaporite rocks of different ages, ranging from Triassic (c. 220 million years ago), through the Miocene (c. 10 million years ago), to Quaternary (recent deposition).

=== Climate ===
Palagruza (Palagruža, Croatia)

Climate chart (precipitation, max. and min. temperature)
J	F	M	A	M	J	J	A	S	O	N	D
35 12 10	29 12 9	33 14 10	23 18 14	21 21 16	17 26 20	14 29 24	12 30 24	18 27 22	32 22 18	45 18 15	34 14 11
- █ Average max. and min. temperatures in °C
- █ Precipitation totals in mm
- Source: Klima Palagruže (http://astrogeo.geoinfo.geof.hr/pelagosa_arhipelag/?page_id=2966)
Imperial conversion
J	F	M	A	M	J	J	A	S	O	N	D
1.4 54 49	1.1 54 48	1.3 56 50	0.9 64 56	0.8 70 60	0.7 79 68	0.5 84 74	0.5 86 75	0.7 80 71	1.3 71 64	1.8 64 58	1.3 57 52
- █ Average max. and min. temperatures in °F
- █ Precipitation totals in inches

Palagruža has a weather station, established in 1894, which represents a major indicator of weather, especially wind, waves and precipitation on the open Adriatic. Weather conditions on the central Adriatic are dictated by movements of low-pressure area, which causes frequent changes of bora and scirocco (jugo) winds. Annually, Palagruža Island has 104 days with strong (6-7 Bf), and 21 days with stormy winds (>8 Bf).

The coldest temperature was −4.3 °C (24.3 °F), on 25 January 1954.

Since records began in 1949, the highest temperature recorded at the local weather station was 36.4 °C (97.5 °F), on 9 August 2017.

Due to its remote position in the middle of the sea, Palagruža exhibits more Mediterranean climate features than the Croatian coast. Summers are sunny and dry, while most of the rain falls in winter months. There are 2620 sunshine hours annually (1961–1990 average). Annual precipitation level of 304 mm (12.0 in) is the lowest of all Croatia. Maritime winds temper air temperatures compared with the mainland, with average summer daily highs of 26.5 °C (79.7 °F); on the other extreme, winter average daily lows are 8.4 °C (47.1 °F).

== Lighthouse ==
Palagruža Lighthouse
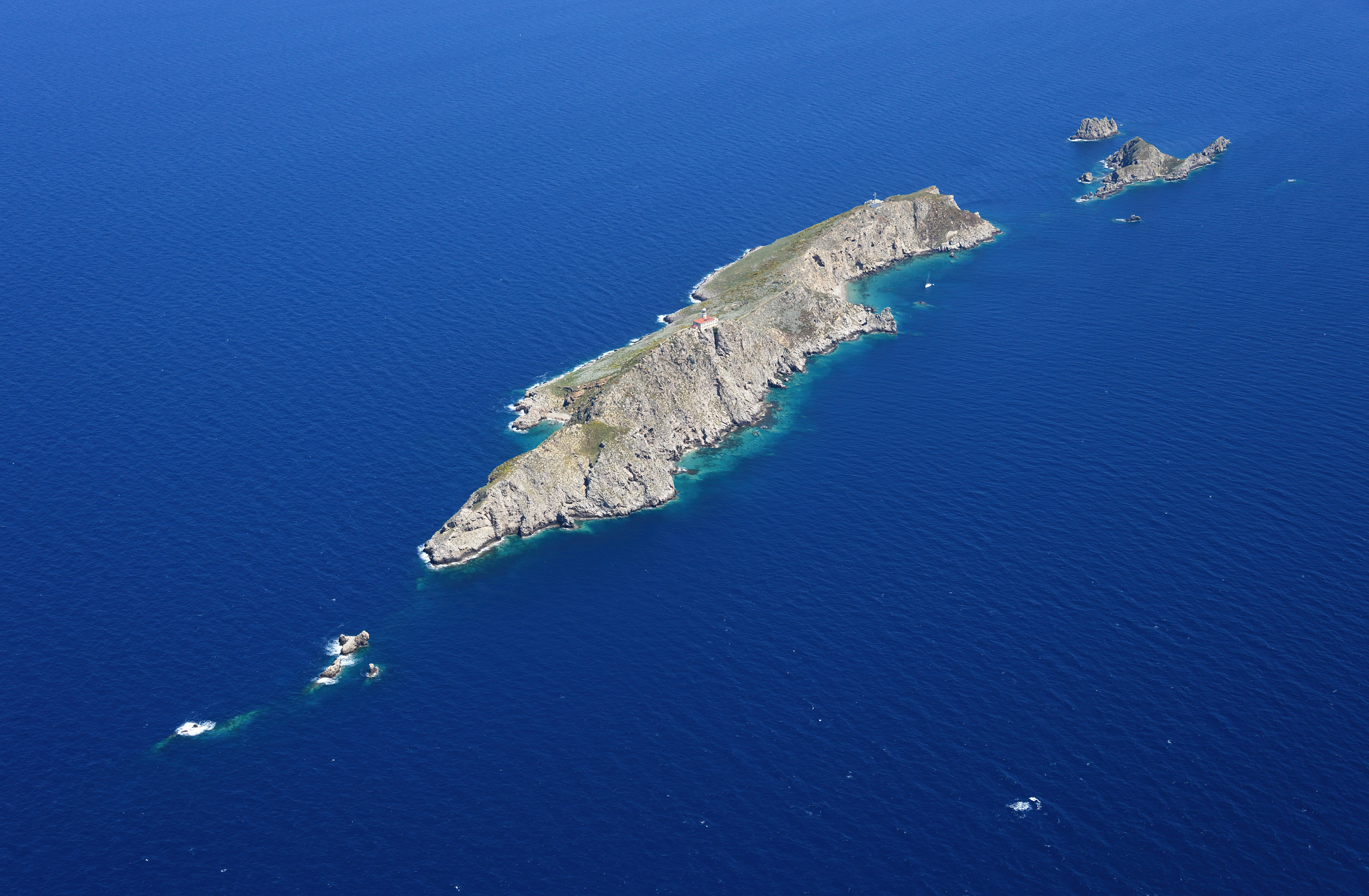
- Location: Palagruža Island, Croatia
- Coordinates: 42.392863°N 16.258828°E

Tower
- Constructed: 1875
- Construction: stone tower
- Height: 23 metres (75 ft)
- Shape: cylindrical tower with balcony and lantern rising at the center of 2-story keeper's house
- Markings: unpainted tower, white lantern
- Power source: solar power

Light
- Focal height: 110 metres (360 ft)
- Range: main: 26 nautical miles (48 km; 30 mi) reserve: 12 nautical miles (22 km; 14 mi)
- Characteristic: Fl W 17.5s.

On the highest point of the main island is a lighthouse. Palagruža is surrounded by dangerous waters, and landing can be difficult. It is uninhabited, except by lighthouse staff and by summer tourists who occupy two units of residential accommodation. There is one beach of golden sand. The lighthouse is also the site of a meteorological station. Other important islands in this archipelago are Mala Palagruža, Galijula and Kamik od Tramuntane.

== Flora and fauna ==
Palagruža sits in the heart of fish-rich seas, including spawning grounds of sardines. It is a nature reserve, and the small amount of vegetation is of the Mediterranean type, for instance oleander (Nerium oleander) and tree spurge (Euphorbia dendroides). There are endemic plant species including a type of knapweed, Centaurea friderici Vis. (Palagruška zečina), and Ornithogalum visianicum. The algae, and their role in the production of the local mineral pelagosite, have been the subject of academic study.

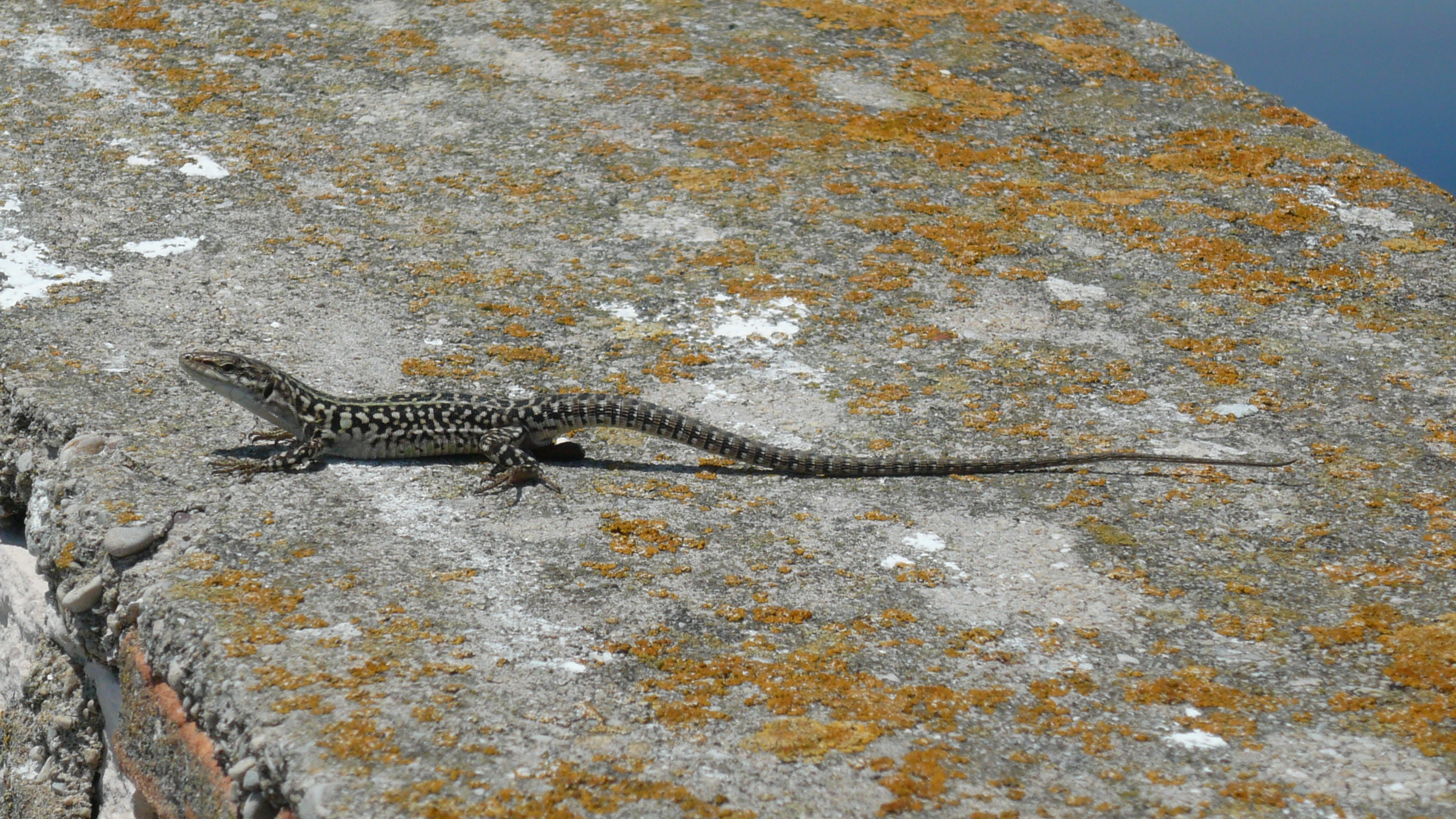
Lizard on Palagruža

The distinctive local fauna, including the black lizard now classed as Podarcis melisellenis ssp. fiumana and the related Podarcis sicula ssp. pelagosana (primorska gušterica in Croatian), was mentioned first by Babić and Rössler (1912). There are not many types of creatures on this island but the ones that do live there are bright and colourful. Some snakes are venomous but are mostly harmless.

=== Birds ===
The Palagruža archipelago, along with the islands of Vis, Sveti Andrija (Svetac) and its neighbouring islet of Kamnik, Brusnik, Biševo, and Jabuka, forms part of the Croatian Offshore Islands Important Bird Area (IBA). This was designated as such by BirdLife International because it supports significant breeding populations of Scopoli's and Yelkouan shearwaters, as well as of Eleonora's falcons.

== See also ==
- List of lighthouses in Croatia
- Korčula
- Vis

== Sources ==
- Babic, K., & E. Rössler (1912) Beobachtungen über die Fauna von Pelagosa. Verhandlungen der kaiserlich-königlichen zoologisch-botanischen Gesellschaft in Wien 62, pp. 220ff.
- Baric, Daniel (2003) Illyrian heroes, Roman emperors, Greek myths: Appropriations and rejections in Dalmatia under Austrian rule (1815–1918). Research project web outline, section III.
- Božanić, Joško (February 1984). "Komiška ribarska epopeja" (PDF). Čakavska rič (in Croatian). XI (1–2). Split Literary Circle: 83–180.
- Forenbaher, Stašo; Kaiser, Timothy (December 1997). "Palagruža, jadranski moreplovci i njihova industrija na prijelazu iz bakrenog u brončano doba" [Palagruža, the Adriatic mariners and their lithic industry during the Copper Age / Bronze Age transition] (PDF). Opuscula Archaeologica (in Croatian). 21 (1). Department of Archaeology, Faculty of Humanities and Social Sciences, University of Zagreb: 15–28.
- Gamulin, Stjepan (2000). "Palagruža, Komiža's fishermen, and fishermen's regatta" (PDF). Croatian Medical Journal. 41 (1): 1–3.
- Kaiser, Timothy, and Stašo Forenbaher (1999) Adriatic sailors and stone knappers: Palagruža in the 3rd millennium BC. Antiquity 73 (280), pp. 313–24.
- Kaiser, Timothy. "Ancient Mariners of the Adriatic: Archaeological Perspectives on Early Navigation". Meet the Professors Lecture Series 2007–2008. Orillia Campus, Lakehead University, Orillia, ON. 11 October 2007.
- Kovačić, Joško (June 1997). "Palagruža od 12. do 20. stoljeća" (PDF). Prilozi povijesti otoka Hvara (in Croatian). X (1): 39–46.
- Montanari, A., et al. (2007) Rediscovering pelagosite. Geophysical Research Abstracts 9.
- Territori irredenti: L'arcipelago di Pelagosa (anonymous, 2003).
- Tvrtko Korbar; et al. (2009). "Geologic reconnaissance of the island of Velika Palagruža". Geologia Croatica. doi:10.4154/gc.2009.07.

Trinchese, Antonio, 'L'immaginaria vicenda delle isole di Pelagosa "colonizzate dai Borbone e dimenticate dai Savoia"', in "Nuovo Monitore Napoletano", 14 aprile 2024
