= Aegiale (wife of Diomedes) =

Ancient Greek mythological figure

Aegiale, also Aegialeia or Aegialia, (Ancient Greek: Αἰγιάλη or Αἰγιάλεια, romanized: Aigialē, lit. 'shore', 'beach' or 'coastline') was, in Greek mythology, a daughter of Adrastus and Amphithea, or of Aegialeus the son of Adrastus, whence she bears the surname of Adrastine. One account refers to her as Euryaleia.

== Mythology ==
Aegiale was married to Diomedes, who, on his return from Troy, found her living in adultery with Cometes. According to some sources, Aegiale had multiple lovers, including a certain Hippolytus. Diomedes attributed this misfortune to the anger of Aphrodite, whom he had wounded in the war against Troy, but when Aegiale went so far as to threaten his life, he fled to Italy. According to Dictys Cretensis, Aegiale, like Clytemnestra, had been seduced to her criminal conduct by a treacherous report, that Diomedes was returning with a Trojan woman who lived with him as his wife, and on his arrival at Argos, Aegiale expelled him. In Ovid, she is described as the type of a bad wife.
