= Harpale (mythology) =

In Greek mythology, Harpale (Ancient Greek: Αρπάλε) was the mother of Poseidon's son Cycnus, king of Colonae in Troad. Otherwise, the mother of the latter was called Scamandrodice or Calyce, daughter of Hecaton, or lastly, an unknown Nereid.
