= Cobis =

Prince in Greek mythology

In Greek mythology, Cobis was a prince of Colonae as son of King Cycnus and brother of Corianus, Glauce and possibly of Tenes and Hemithea. After the death of their father, he and his siblings, Corianus and Glauce were presented as ransom of the people of Colonae though ransomed their city to the Achaean forces.
