= Glauce =

Set of names from Greek mythology

In Greek mythology, Glauce (/ˈɡlɔːsiː/; Ancient Greek: Γλαύκη, romanized: Glaukê, lit. 'blue-gray' or 'gleaming'), Latin Glauca, refers to different people:

- Glauce, an Arcadian nymph, one of the nurses of Zeus. She and the other nurses were represented on the altar of Athena Alea at Tegea.
- Glauce, twin sister of Pluto who died as an infant according to Euhemerus.
- Glauce, one of the Melian nymphs.
- Glauce, one of the 50 Nereids, marine-nymph daughters of the 'Old Man of the Sea' Nereus and the Oceanid Doris. She personifies the color of the sea which can be attributed to her name that signifies "sea-green" or "bright green". Glauce and her other sisters appear to Thetis when she cries out in sympathy for the grief of Achilles at the slaying of his friend Patroclus.
- Glauce, mother, by Upis, of "the third" Artemis in Cicero's rationalized genealogy of the Greek gods.
- Glauce, a Libyan princess as one of the 50 Danaïdes, daughters of King Danaus of Libya (and later Argos). Her mother was either Atlanteia or Phoebe, both were hamadryads. Glauce married and murdered her cousin–husband Alces, son of King Aegyptus of Egypt by an Arabian woman.
- Glauce, a Corinthian princess as the daughter of King Creon. Also known by the name Creusa, predominantly in Latin authors, e.g. Seneca and Propertius. Hyginus uses both names interchangeably. In Cherubini's opera Medea she is known as Dircé. She married Jason. Creusa was killed, along with her father, by Medea, who either sent her a peplos steeped in flammable poison or set fire to the royal palace. In the local Corinthian tradition, Glauce threw herself into a well in a vain attempt to wash off Medea's poison; from this circumstance the well became known as the Well of Glauce.
- Glauce, an Amazon. Some say that it was she, and not Antiope, who was abducted by Theseus and became his wife.
- Glauce, a Salaminian princess as the daughter of King Cychreus, son of Poseidon and Salamis. Some sources say that Glauce married Actaeus and bore him a son Telamon. Others say that Telamon was her husband and that, after her death, he married Periboea, mother of Ajax.
- Glauce, also known as Laodice, was a princess of Colonae as daughter of King Cycnus, sister of Cobis and Corianus. During the Trojan campaign, she was taken captive by the Greeks and was given to Ajax, by whom she became mother of Aeantides.
