= Hecaton =

Father of Calyce in Greek mythology

In Greek mythology, Hecaton (Ancient Greek: Ἑκατόν) or Hecataeon, was the father of Calyce, who was seduced by the god Poseidon and had a son with him named Cycnus. This character Hecaton (meaning "hundred") is otherwise unknown, but the name may be connected with the Hecatonnesoi ("hundred islands"), in the Adramyttian Gulf.
